

62001–62100 

|-bgcolor=#E9E9E9
| 62001 ||  || — || September 3, 2000 || Kitt Peak || Spacewatch || — || align=right | 3.2 km || 
|-id=002 bgcolor=#E9E9E9
| 62002 ||  || — || September 4, 2000 || Socorro || LINEAR || — || align=right | 6.9 km || 
|-id=003 bgcolor=#E9E9E9
| 62003 ||  || — || September 5, 2000 || Kvistaberg || UDAS || — || align=right | 5.8 km || 
|-id=004 bgcolor=#E9E9E9
| 62004 ||  || — || September 5, 2000 || Kvistaberg || UDAS || — || align=right | 3.3 km || 
|-id=005 bgcolor=#fefefe
| 62005 ||  || — || September 1, 2000 || Socorro || LINEAR || V || align=right | 3.2 km || 
|-id=006 bgcolor=#fefefe
| 62006 ||  || — || September 2, 2000 || Socorro || LINEAR || — || align=right | 2.7 km || 
|-id=007 bgcolor=#fefefe
| 62007 ||  || — || September 1, 2000 || Socorro || LINEAR || NYS || align=right | 2.0 km || 
|-id=008 bgcolor=#d6d6d6
| 62008 ||  || — || September 1, 2000 || Socorro || LINEAR || HYG || align=right | 13 km || 
|-id=009 bgcolor=#d6d6d6
| 62009 ||  || — || September 2, 2000 || Socorro || LINEAR || Tj (2.99) || align=right | 9.1 km || 
|-id=010 bgcolor=#d6d6d6
| 62010 ||  || — || September 3, 2000 || Socorro || LINEAR || EOS || align=right | 6.0 km || 
|-id=011 bgcolor=#E9E9E9
| 62011 ||  || — || September 3, 2000 || Socorro || LINEAR || — || align=right | 6.8 km || 
|-id=012 bgcolor=#d6d6d6
| 62012 ||  || — || September 3, 2000 || Socorro || LINEAR || EOS || align=right | 5.6 km || 
|-id=013 bgcolor=#fefefe
| 62013 ||  || — || September 3, 2000 || Socorro || LINEAR || — || align=right | 5.9 km || 
|-id=014 bgcolor=#d6d6d6
| 62014 ||  || — || September 3, 2000 || Socorro || LINEAR || — || align=right | 4.5 km || 
|-id=015 bgcolor=#d6d6d6
| 62015 ||  || — || September 3, 2000 || Socorro || LINEAR || — || align=right | 4.4 km || 
|-id=016 bgcolor=#d6d6d6
| 62016 ||  || — || September 3, 2000 || Socorro || LINEAR || EOS || align=right | 5.7 km || 
|-id=017 bgcolor=#d6d6d6
| 62017 ||  || — || September 3, 2000 || Socorro || LINEAR || — || align=right | 8.1 km || 
|-id=018 bgcolor=#d6d6d6
| 62018 ||  || — || September 3, 2000 || Socorro || LINEAR || EOS || align=right | 4.9 km || 
|-id=019 bgcolor=#d6d6d6
| 62019 ||  || — || September 3, 2000 || Socorro || LINEAR || — || align=right | 8.8 km || 
|-id=020 bgcolor=#fefefe
| 62020 ||  || — || September 3, 2000 || Socorro || LINEAR || — || align=right | 2.4 km || 
|-id=021 bgcolor=#fefefe
| 62021 ||  || — || September 3, 2000 || Socorro || LINEAR || NYS || align=right | 1.8 km || 
|-id=022 bgcolor=#d6d6d6
| 62022 ||  || — || September 3, 2000 || Socorro || LINEAR || — || align=right | 8.2 km || 
|-id=023 bgcolor=#E9E9E9
| 62023 ||  || — || September 3, 2000 || Socorro || LINEAR || MAR || align=right | 3.4 km || 
|-id=024 bgcolor=#E9E9E9
| 62024 ||  || — || September 5, 2000 || Socorro || LINEAR || — || align=right | 3.1 km || 
|-id=025 bgcolor=#d6d6d6
| 62025 ||  || — || September 5, 2000 || Socorro || LINEAR || — || align=right | 11 km || 
|-id=026 bgcolor=#d6d6d6
| 62026 ||  || — || September 5, 2000 || Socorro || LINEAR || AEG || align=right | 7.6 km || 
|-id=027 bgcolor=#fefefe
| 62027 ||  || — || September 4, 2000 || Socorro || LINEAR || V || align=right | 2.1 km || 
|-id=028 bgcolor=#E9E9E9
| 62028 ||  || — || September 1, 2000 || Črni Vrh || Črni Vrh || PAD || align=right | 4.0 km || 
|-id=029 bgcolor=#d6d6d6
| 62029 ||  || — || September 3, 2000 || Socorro || LINEAR || — || align=right | 12 km || 
|-id=030 bgcolor=#E9E9E9
| 62030 ||  || — || September 6, 2000 || Socorro || LINEAR || — || align=right | 8.9 km || 
|-id=031 bgcolor=#E9E9E9
| 62031 ||  || — || September 5, 2000 || Prescott || P. G. Comba || — || align=right | 4.7 km || 
|-id=032 bgcolor=#d6d6d6
| 62032 ||  || — || September 7, 2000 || Kitt Peak || Spacewatch || SAN || align=right | 2.8 km || 
|-id=033 bgcolor=#fefefe
| 62033 ||  || — || September 7, 2000 || Kitt Peak || Spacewatch || — || align=right | 1.9 km || 
|-id=034 bgcolor=#fefefe
| 62034 ||  || — || September 8, 2000 || Desert Beaver || W. K. Y. Yeung || — || align=right | 4.2 km || 
|-id=035 bgcolor=#E9E9E9
| 62035 ||  || — || September 1, 2000 || Socorro || LINEAR || — || align=right | 3.1 km || 
|-id=036 bgcolor=#d6d6d6
| 62036 ||  || — || September 1, 2000 || Socorro || LINEAR || URS || align=right | 14 km || 
|-id=037 bgcolor=#fefefe
| 62037 ||  || — || September 1, 2000 || Socorro || LINEAR || — || align=right | 2.4 km || 
|-id=038 bgcolor=#d6d6d6
| 62038 ||  || — || September 3, 2000 || Socorro || LINEAR || HYG || align=right | 8.0 km || 
|-id=039 bgcolor=#d6d6d6
| 62039 ||  || — || September 3, 2000 || Socorro || LINEAR || — || align=right | 7.3 km || 
|-id=040 bgcolor=#fefefe
| 62040 ||  || — || September 3, 2000 || Socorro || LINEAR || ERI || align=right | 4.4 km || 
|-id=041 bgcolor=#E9E9E9
| 62041 ||  || — || September 1, 2000 || Socorro || LINEAR || — || align=right | 2.6 km || 
|-id=042 bgcolor=#FA8072
| 62042 ||  || — || September 1, 2000 || Socorro || LINEAR || — || align=right | 2.3 km || 
|-id=043 bgcolor=#d6d6d6
| 62043 ||  || — || September 1, 2000 || Socorro || LINEAR || — || align=right | 9.6 km || 
|-id=044 bgcolor=#d6d6d6
| 62044 ||  || — || September 1, 2000 || Socorro || LINEAR || — || align=right | 2.9 km || 
|-id=045 bgcolor=#fefefe
| 62045 ||  || — || September 1, 2000 || Socorro || LINEAR || V || align=right | 1.6 km || 
|-id=046 bgcolor=#fefefe
| 62046 ||  || — || September 1, 2000 || Socorro || LINEAR || — || align=right | 1.9 km || 
|-id=047 bgcolor=#FA8072
| 62047 ||  || — || September 1, 2000 || Socorro || LINEAR || — || align=right | 1.9 km || 
|-id=048 bgcolor=#fefefe
| 62048 ||  || — || September 1, 2000 || Socorro || LINEAR || NYS || align=right | 4.0 km || 
|-id=049 bgcolor=#fefefe
| 62049 ||  || — || September 1, 2000 || Socorro || LINEAR || NYS || align=right | 1.7 km || 
|-id=050 bgcolor=#E9E9E9
| 62050 ||  || — || September 1, 2000 || Socorro || LINEAR || — || align=right | 2.9 km || 
|-id=051 bgcolor=#d6d6d6
| 62051 ||  || — || September 2, 2000 || Socorro || LINEAR || EOS || align=right | 4.8 km || 
|-id=052 bgcolor=#fefefe
| 62052 ||  || — || September 2, 2000 || Socorro || LINEAR || — || align=right | 4.0 km || 
|-id=053 bgcolor=#d6d6d6
| 62053 ||  || — || September 2, 2000 || Socorro || LINEAR || HYG || align=right | 8.7 km || 
|-id=054 bgcolor=#d6d6d6
| 62054 ||  || — || September 2, 2000 || Socorro || LINEAR || HYG || align=right | 7.4 km || 
|-id=055 bgcolor=#E9E9E9
| 62055 ||  || — || September 2, 2000 || Socorro || LINEAR || — || align=right | 5.7 km || 
|-id=056 bgcolor=#d6d6d6
| 62056 ||  || — || September 2, 2000 || Socorro || LINEAR || EOS || align=right | 4.5 km || 
|-id=057 bgcolor=#E9E9E9
| 62057 ||  || — || September 2, 2000 || Socorro || LINEAR || — || align=right | 2.6 km || 
|-id=058 bgcolor=#E9E9E9
| 62058 ||  || — || September 2, 2000 || Socorro || LINEAR || — || align=right | 5.7 km || 
|-id=059 bgcolor=#E9E9E9
| 62059 ||  || — || September 2, 2000 || Socorro || LINEAR || — || align=right | 1.9 km || 
|-id=060 bgcolor=#fefefe
| 62060 ||  || — || September 2, 2000 || Socorro || LINEAR || KLI || align=right | 4.1 km || 
|-id=061 bgcolor=#E9E9E9
| 62061 ||  || — || September 2, 2000 || Socorro || LINEAR || — || align=right | 2.6 km || 
|-id=062 bgcolor=#E9E9E9
| 62062 ||  || — || September 2, 2000 || Socorro || LINEAR || — || align=right | 3.3 km || 
|-id=063 bgcolor=#fefefe
| 62063 ||  || — || September 2, 2000 || Socorro || LINEAR || FLO || align=right | 1.6 km || 
|-id=064 bgcolor=#fefefe
| 62064 ||  || — || September 2, 2000 || Socorro || LINEAR || — || align=right | 2.6 km || 
|-id=065 bgcolor=#E9E9E9
| 62065 ||  || — || September 2, 2000 || Socorro || LINEAR || — || align=right | 3.5 km || 
|-id=066 bgcolor=#E9E9E9
| 62066 ||  || — || September 2, 2000 || Socorro || LINEAR || — || align=right | 4.5 km || 
|-id=067 bgcolor=#E9E9E9
| 62067 ||  || — || September 2, 2000 || Socorro || LINEAR || MAR || align=right | 4.8 km || 
|-id=068 bgcolor=#E9E9E9
| 62068 ||  || — || September 3, 2000 || Socorro || LINEAR || — || align=right | 4.6 km || 
|-id=069 bgcolor=#E9E9E9
| 62069 ||  || — || September 4, 2000 || Socorro || LINEAR || BRU || align=right | 5.7 km || 
|-id=070 bgcolor=#d6d6d6
| 62070 ||  || — || September 7, 2000 || Socorro || LINEAR || EOS || align=right | 7.4 km || 
|-id=071 bgcolor=#E9E9E9
| 62071 Voegtli ||  ||  || September 8, 2000 || Gnosca || S. Sposetti || — || align=right | 5.1 km || 
|-id=072 bgcolor=#E9E9E9
| 62072 ||  || — || September 9, 2000 || Črni Vrh || Črni Vrh || — || align=right | 3.0 km || 
|-id=073 bgcolor=#fefefe
| 62073 ||  || — || September 10, 2000 || Črni Vrh || Črni Vrh || V || align=right | 3.0 km || 
|-id=074 bgcolor=#E9E9E9
| 62074 ||  || — || September 8, 2000 || Socorro || LINEAR || HNS || align=right | 4.6 km || 
|-id=075 bgcolor=#E9E9E9
| 62075 ||  || — || September 1, 2000 || Socorro || LINEAR || JUN || align=right | 4.3 km || 
|-id=076 bgcolor=#d6d6d6
| 62076 ||  || — || September 1, 2000 || Socorro || LINEAR || — || align=right | 7.9 km || 
|-id=077 bgcolor=#E9E9E9
| 62077 ||  || — || September 1, 2000 || Socorro || LINEAR || MAR || align=right | 2.6 km || 
|-id=078 bgcolor=#E9E9E9
| 62078 ||  || — || September 1, 2000 || Socorro || LINEAR || EUN || align=right | 3.2 km || 
|-id=079 bgcolor=#d6d6d6
| 62079 ||  || — || September 1, 2000 || Socorro || LINEAR || — || align=right | 8.8 km || 
|-id=080 bgcolor=#E9E9E9
| 62080 ||  || — || September 1, 2000 || Socorro || LINEAR || — || align=right | 5.2 km || 
|-id=081 bgcolor=#E9E9E9
| 62081 ||  || — || September 1, 2000 || Socorro || LINEAR || ADE || align=right | 7.2 km || 
|-id=082 bgcolor=#E9E9E9
| 62082 ||  || — || September 1, 2000 || Socorro || LINEAR || — || align=right | 3.1 km || 
|-id=083 bgcolor=#fefefe
| 62083 ||  || — || September 2, 2000 || Anderson Mesa || LONEOS || — || align=right | 3.4 km || 
|-id=084 bgcolor=#d6d6d6
| 62084 ||  || — || September 2, 2000 || Socorro || LINEAR || VER || align=right | 7.3 km || 
|-id=085 bgcolor=#fefefe
| 62085 ||  || — || September 2, 2000 || Anderson Mesa || LONEOS || NYS || align=right | 2.0 km || 
|-id=086 bgcolor=#E9E9E9
| 62086 ||  || — || September 2, 2000 || Anderson Mesa || LONEOS || — || align=right | 6.6 km || 
|-id=087 bgcolor=#E9E9E9
| 62087 ||  || — || September 2, 2000 || Haleakala || NEAT || — || align=right | 7.7 km || 
|-id=088 bgcolor=#d6d6d6
| 62088 ||  || — || September 3, 2000 || Socorro || LINEAR || — || align=right | 7.2 km || 
|-id=089 bgcolor=#E9E9E9
| 62089 ||  || — || September 3, 2000 || Socorro || LINEAR || — || align=right | 2.4 km || 
|-id=090 bgcolor=#E9E9E9
| 62090 ||  || — || September 3, 2000 || Socorro || LINEAR || GEF || align=right | 2.4 km || 
|-id=091 bgcolor=#fefefe
| 62091 ||  || — || September 3, 2000 || Socorro || LINEAR || NYS || align=right | 4.0 km || 
|-id=092 bgcolor=#fefefe
| 62092 ||  || — || September 3, 2000 || Socorro || LINEAR || V || align=right | 1.7 km || 
|-id=093 bgcolor=#E9E9E9
| 62093 ||  || — || September 3, 2000 || Socorro || LINEAR || — || align=right | 2.1 km || 
|-id=094 bgcolor=#E9E9E9
| 62094 ||  || — || September 3, 2000 || Socorro || LINEAR || PAD || align=right | 4.7 km || 
|-id=095 bgcolor=#d6d6d6
| 62095 ||  || — || September 3, 2000 || Kitt Peak || Spacewatch || — || align=right | 7.8 km || 
|-id=096 bgcolor=#E9E9E9
| 62096 ||  || — || September 4, 2000 || Anderson Mesa || LONEOS || HOF || align=right | 8.6 km || 
|-id=097 bgcolor=#E9E9E9
| 62097 ||  || — || September 4, 2000 || Anderson Mesa || LONEOS || — || align=right | 2.3 km || 
|-id=098 bgcolor=#fefefe
| 62098 ||  || — || September 4, 2000 || Anderson Mesa || LONEOS || — || align=right | 4.3 km || 
|-id=099 bgcolor=#fefefe
| 62099 ||  || — || September 4, 2000 || Anderson Mesa || LONEOS || NYS || align=right | 1.5 km || 
|-id=100 bgcolor=#E9E9E9
| 62100 ||  || — || September 4, 2000 || Anderson Mesa || LONEOS || — || align=right | 2.5 km || 
|}

62101–62200 

|-bgcolor=#d6d6d6
| 62101 ||  || — || September 4, 2000 || Anderson Mesa || LONEOS || — || align=right | 10 km || 
|-id=102 bgcolor=#fefefe
| 62102 ||  || — || September 4, 2000 || Anderson Mesa || LONEOS || NYS || align=right | 2.4 km || 
|-id=103 bgcolor=#E9E9E9
| 62103 ||  || — || September 4, 2000 || Anderson Mesa || LONEOS || AGN || align=right | 2.9 km || 
|-id=104 bgcolor=#fefefe
| 62104 ||  || — || September 4, 2000 || Anderson Mesa || LONEOS || NYS || align=right data-sort-value="0.99" | 990 m || 
|-id=105 bgcolor=#E9E9E9
| 62105 ||  || — || September 4, 2000 || Haleakala || NEAT || — || align=right | 3.4 km || 
|-id=106 bgcolor=#fefefe
| 62106 ||  || — || September 5, 2000 || Anderson Mesa || LONEOS || PHO || align=right | 2.9 km || 
|-id=107 bgcolor=#d6d6d6
| 62107 ||  || — || September 5, 2000 || Anderson Mesa || LONEOS || ALA || align=right | 12 km || 
|-id=108 bgcolor=#d6d6d6
| 62108 ||  || — || September 5, 2000 || Anderson Mesa || LONEOS || ALA || align=right | 10 km || 
|-id=109 bgcolor=#E9E9E9
| 62109 ||  || — || September 5, 2000 || Anderson Mesa || LONEOS || HNS || align=right | 3.3 km || 
|-id=110 bgcolor=#E9E9E9
| 62110 ||  || — || September 5, 2000 || Anderson Mesa || LONEOS || — || align=right | 7.9 km || 
|-id=111 bgcolor=#E9E9E9
| 62111 ||  || — || September 5, 2000 || Anderson Mesa || LONEOS || — || align=right | 6.6 km || 
|-id=112 bgcolor=#d6d6d6
| 62112 ||  || — || September 5, 2000 || Anderson Mesa || LONEOS || — || align=right | 5.3 km || 
|-id=113 bgcolor=#d6d6d6
| 62113 ||  || — || September 5, 2000 || Anderson Mesa || LONEOS || — || align=right | 9.1 km || 
|-id=114 bgcolor=#C2FFFF
| 62114 ||  || — || September 5, 2000 || Anderson Mesa || LONEOS || L5 || align=right | 20 km || 
|-id=115 bgcolor=#E9E9E9
| 62115 ||  || — || September 5, 2000 || Anderson Mesa || LONEOS || — || align=right | 3.7 km || 
|-id=116 bgcolor=#E9E9E9
| 62116 ||  || — || September 5, 2000 || Anderson Mesa || LONEOS || MAR || align=right | 4.7 km || 
|-id=117 bgcolor=#d6d6d6
| 62117 ||  || — || September 5, 2000 || Anderson Mesa || LONEOS || EUP || align=right | 12 km || 
|-id=118 bgcolor=#d6d6d6
| 62118 ||  || — || September 5, 2000 || Anderson Mesa || LONEOS || — || align=right | 9.3 km || 
|-id=119 bgcolor=#d6d6d6
| 62119 ||  || — || September 5, 2000 || Anderson Mesa || LONEOS || — || align=right | 5.8 km || 
|-id=120 bgcolor=#E9E9E9
| 62120 ||  || — || September 5, 2000 || Anderson Mesa || LONEOS || — || align=right | 7.9 km || 
|-id=121 bgcolor=#E9E9E9
| 62121 ||  || — || September 5, 2000 || Anderson Mesa || LONEOS || MAR || align=right | 2.9 km || 
|-id=122 bgcolor=#E9E9E9
| 62122 ||  || — || September 5, 2000 || Anderson Mesa || LONEOS || — || align=right | 4.9 km || 
|-id=123 bgcolor=#E9E9E9
| 62123 ||  || — || September 5, 2000 || Anderson Mesa || LONEOS || — || align=right | 3.2 km || 
|-id=124 bgcolor=#E9E9E9
| 62124 ||  || — || September 5, 2000 || Anderson Mesa || LONEOS || MAR || align=right | 4.8 km || 
|-id=125 bgcolor=#d6d6d6
| 62125 ||  || — || September 6, 2000 || Socorro || LINEAR || — || align=right | 9.6 km || 
|-id=126 bgcolor=#d6d6d6
| 62126 ||  || — || September 6, 2000 || Socorro || LINEAR || — || align=right | 9.1 km || 
|-id=127 bgcolor=#E9E9E9
| 62127 ||  || — || September 5, 2000 || Socorro || LINEAR || — || align=right | 2.4 km || 
|-id=128 bgcolor=#d6d6d6
| 62128 ||  || — || September 18, 2000 || Socorro || LINEAR || EUP || align=right | 23 km || 
|-id=129 bgcolor=#fefefe
| 62129 ||  || — || September 19, 2000 || Socorro || LINEAR || PHO || align=right | 2.1 km || 
|-id=130 bgcolor=#E9E9E9
| 62130 ||  || — || September 20, 2000 || Desert Beaver || W. K. Y. Yeung || — || align=right | 2.1 km || 
|-id=131 bgcolor=#d6d6d6
| 62131 ||  || — || September 21, 2000 || Ametlla de Mar || J. Nomen || EOS || align=right | 4.8 km || 
|-id=132 bgcolor=#fefefe
| 62132 ||  || — || September 21, 2000 || Ametlla de Mar || J. Nomen || V || align=right | 1.6 km || 
|-id=133 bgcolor=#fefefe
| 62133 ||  || — || September 20, 2000 || Socorro || LINEAR || PHO || align=right | 5.4 km || 
|-id=134 bgcolor=#d6d6d6
| 62134 ||  || — || September 21, 2000 || Olathe || L. Robinson || EOS || align=right | 4.2 km || 
|-id=135 bgcolor=#fefefe
| 62135 ||  || — || September 20, 2000 || Socorro || LINEAR || PHO || align=right | 2.8 km || 
|-id=136 bgcolor=#fefefe
| 62136 ||  || — || September 21, 2000 || Socorro || LINEAR || FLO || align=right | 1.8 km || 
|-id=137 bgcolor=#d6d6d6
| 62137 ||  || — || September 22, 2000 || Kitt Peak || Spacewatch || — || align=right | 8.8 km || 
|-id=138 bgcolor=#fefefe
| 62138 ||  || — || September 22, 2000 || Prescott || P. G. Comba || V || align=right | 1.4 km || 
|-id=139 bgcolor=#E9E9E9
| 62139 ||  || — || September 20, 2000 || Socorro || LINEAR || — || align=right | 2.1 km || 
|-id=140 bgcolor=#fefefe
| 62140 ||  || — || September 20, 2000 || Socorro || LINEAR || NYS || align=right | 1.8 km || 
|-id=141 bgcolor=#fefefe
| 62141 ||  || — || September 20, 2000 || Socorro || LINEAR || — || align=right | 2.8 km || 
|-id=142 bgcolor=#E9E9E9
| 62142 ||  || — || September 21, 2000 || Socorro || LINEAR || — || align=right | 5.2 km || 
|-id=143 bgcolor=#E9E9E9
| 62143 ||  || — || September 23, 2000 || Socorro || LINEAR || — || align=right | 6.1 km || 
|-id=144 bgcolor=#E9E9E9
| 62144 ||  || — || September 23, 2000 || Socorro || LINEAR || EUN || align=right | 3.1 km || 
|-id=145 bgcolor=#d6d6d6
| 62145 ||  || — || September 23, 2000 || Socorro || LINEAR || HIL3:2 || align=right | 12 km || 
|-id=146 bgcolor=#d6d6d6
| 62146 ||  || — || September 23, 2000 || Socorro || LINEAR || — || align=right | 6.3 km || 
|-id=147 bgcolor=#d6d6d6
| 62147 ||  || — || September 23, 2000 || Socorro || LINEAR || EMA || align=right | 6.7 km || 
|-id=148 bgcolor=#E9E9E9
| 62148 ||  || — || September 23, 2000 || Socorro || LINEAR || — || align=right | 4.9 km || 
|-id=149 bgcolor=#d6d6d6
| 62149 ||  || — || September 23, 2000 || Socorro || LINEAR || — || align=right | 13 km || 
|-id=150 bgcolor=#d6d6d6
| 62150 ||  || — || September 23, 2000 || Socorro || LINEAR || — || align=right | 8.0 km || 
|-id=151 bgcolor=#fefefe
| 62151 ||  || — || September 24, 2000 || Bisei SG Center || BATTeRS || — || align=right | 4.3 km || 
|-id=152 bgcolor=#E9E9E9
| 62152 ||  || — || September 24, 2000 || Bisei SG Center || BATTeRS || — || align=right | 3.9 km || 
|-id=153 bgcolor=#E9E9E9
| 62153 ||  || — || September 24, 2000 || Bisei SG Center || BATTeRS || — || align=right | 6.6 km || 
|-id=154 bgcolor=#d6d6d6
| 62154 ||  || — || September 20, 2000 || Haleakala || NEAT || — || align=right | 7.2 km || 
|-id=155 bgcolor=#fefefe
| 62155 ||  || — || September 25, 2000 || Višnjan Observatory || K. Korlević || — || align=right | 2.4 km || 
|-id=156 bgcolor=#E9E9E9
| 62156 ||  || — || September 26, 2000 || Višnjan Observatory || K. Korlević || EUN || align=right | 3.3 km || 
|-id=157 bgcolor=#fefefe
| 62157 ||  || — || September 24, 2000 || Socorro || LINEAR || H || align=right | 1.6 km || 
|-id=158 bgcolor=#fefefe
| 62158 ||  || — || September 23, 2000 || Socorro || LINEAR || — || align=right | 2.8 km || 
|-id=159 bgcolor=#E9E9E9
| 62159 ||  || — || September 23, 2000 || Socorro || LINEAR || ADE || align=right | 6.1 km || 
|-id=160 bgcolor=#E9E9E9
| 62160 ||  || — || September 23, 2000 || Socorro || LINEAR || — || align=right | 6.3 km || 
|-id=161 bgcolor=#fefefe
| 62161 ||  || — || September 23, 2000 || Socorro || LINEAR || — || align=right | 2.2 km || 
|-id=162 bgcolor=#d6d6d6
| 62162 ||  || — || September 23, 2000 || Socorro || LINEAR || NAE || align=right | 7.5 km || 
|-id=163 bgcolor=#d6d6d6
| 62163 ||  || — || September 23, 2000 || Socorro || LINEAR || — || align=right | 6.2 km || 
|-id=164 bgcolor=#d6d6d6
| 62164 ||  || — || September 23, 2000 || Socorro || LINEAR || EOS || align=right | 4.1 km || 
|-id=165 bgcolor=#d6d6d6
| 62165 ||  || — || September 24, 2000 || Socorro || LINEAR || HYG || align=right | 6.9 km || 
|-id=166 bgcolor=#fefefe
| 62166 ||  || — || September 24, 2000 || Socorro || LINEAR || — || align=right | 1.5 km || 
|-id=167 bgcolor=#E9E9E9
| 62167 ||  || — || September 24, 2000 || Socorro || LINEAR || HEN || align=right | 2.1 km || 
|-id=168 bgcolor=#fefefe
| 62168 ||  || — || September 24, 2000 || Socorro || LINEAR || NYS || align=right | 1.6 km || 
|-id=169 bgcolor=#E9E9E9
| 62169 ||  || — || September 24, 2000 || Socorro || LINEAR || — || align=right | 3.6 km || 
|-id=170 bgcolor=#fefefe
| 62170 ||  || — || September 24, 2000 || Socorro || LINEAR || — || align=right | 2.0 km || 
|-id=171 bgcolor=#E9E9E9
| 62171 ||  || — || September 24, 2000 || Socorro || LINEAR || HEN || align=right | 2.7 km || 
|-id=172 bgcolor=#E9E9E9
| 62172 ||  || — || September 24, 2000 || Socorro || LINEAR || — || align=right | 2.6 km || 
|-id=173 bgcolor=#d6d6d6
| 62173 ||  || — || September 24, 2000 || Socorro || LINEAR || — || align=right | 6.8 km || 
|-id=174 bgcolor=#d6d6d6
| 62174 ||  || — || September 24, 2000 || Socorro || LINEAR || — || align=right | 5.1 km || 
|-id=175 bgcolor=#E9E9E9
| 62175 ||  || — || September 24, 2000 || Socorro || LINEAR || — || align=right | 1.7 km || 
|-id=176 bgcolor=#E9E9E9
| 62176 ||  || — || September 24, 2000 || Socorro || LINEAR || — || align=right | 3.1 km || 
|-id=177 bgcolor=#E9E9E9
| 62177 ||  || — || September 24, 2000 || Socorro || LINEAR || HEN || align=right | 2.8 km || 
|-id=178 bgcolor=#E9E9E9
| 62178 ||  || — || September 24, 2000 || Socorro || LINEAR || — || align=right | 5.0 km || 
|-id=179 bgcolor=#E9E9E9
| 62179 ||  || — || September 24, 2000 || Socorro || LINEAR || — || align=right | 2.9 km || 
|-id=180 bgcolor=#d6d6d6
| 62180 ||  || — || September 24, 2000 || Socorro || LINEAR || EOS || align=right | 4.2 km || 
|-id=181 bgcolor=#E9E9E9
| 62181 ||  || — || September 24, 2000 || Socorro || LINEAR || — || align=right | 5.7 km || 
|-id=182 bgcolor=#E9E9E9
| 62182 ||  || — || September 24, 2000 || Socorro || LINEAR || — || align=right | 2.5 km || 
|-id=183 bgcolor=#E9E9E9
| 62183 ||  || — || September 24, 2000 || Socorro || LINEAR || — || align=right | 2.3 km || 
|-id=184 bgcolor=#E9E9E9
| 62184 ||  || — || September 24, 2000 || Socorro || LINEAR || — || align=right | 3.9 km || 
|-id=185 bgcolor=#d6d6d6
| 62185 ||  || — || September 24, 2000 || Socorro || LINEAR || EOS || align=right | 6.0 km || 
|-id=186 bgcolor=#fefefe
| 62186 ||  || — || September 24, 2000 || Socorro || LINEAR || — || align=right | 1.6 km || 
|-id=187 bgcolor=#E9E9E9
| 62187 ||  || — || September 24, 2000 || Socorro || LINEAR || NEM || align=right | 6.1 km || 
|-id=188 bgcolor=#d6d6d6
| 62188 ||  || — || September 24, 2000 || Socorro || LINEAR || — || align=right | 6.4 km || 
|-id=189 bgcolor=#d6d6d6
| 62189 ||  || — || September 24, 2000 || Socorro || LINEAR || EOS || align=right | 3.9 km || 
|-id=190 bgcolor=#E9E9E9
| 62190 Augusthorch ||  ||  || September 26, 2000 || Drebach || J. Kandler || — || align=right | 2.9 km || 
|-id=191 bgcolor=#E9E9E9
| 62191 ||  || — || September 22, 2000 || Socorro || LINEAR || MAR || align=right | 2.5 km || 
|-id=192 bgcolor=#E9E9E9
| 62192 ||  || — || September 23, 2000 || Socorro || LINEAR || EUN || align=right | 3.3 km || 
|-id=193 bgcolor=#d6d6d6
| 62193 ||  || — || September 23, 2000 || Socorro || LINEAR || — || align=right | 13 km || 
|-id=194 bgcolor=#E9E9E9
| 62194 ||  || — || September 23, 2000 || Socorro || LINEAR || — || align=right | 4.0 km || 
|-id=195 bgcolor=#E9E9E9
| 62195 ||  || — || September 23, 2000 || Socorro || LINEAR || — || align=right | 6.2 km || 
|-id=196 bgcolor=#d6d6d6
| 62196 ||  || — || September 23, 2000 || Socorro || LINEAR || — || align=right | 3.2 km || 
|-id=197 bgcolor=#d6d6d6
| 62197 ||  || — || September 23, 2000 || Socorro || LINEAR || — || align=right | 5.2 km || 
|-id=198 bgcolor=#E9E9E9
| 62198 ||  || — || September 24, 2000 || Socorro || LINEAR || — || align=right | 3.0 km || 
|-id=199 bgcolor=#d6d6d6
| 62199 ||  || — || September 24, 2000 || Socorro || LINEAR || EOS || align=right | 4.8 km || 
|-id=200 bgcolor=#E9E9E9
| 62200 ||  || — || September 24, 2000 || Socorro || LINEAR || — || align=right | 2.4 km || 
|}

62201–62300 

|-bgcolor=#C2FFFF
| 62201 ||  || — || September 24, 2000 || Socorro || LINEAR || L5 || align=right | 19 km || 
|-id=202 bgcolor=#E9E9E9
| 62202 ||  || — || September 24, 2000 || Socorro || LINEAR || — || align=right | 5.3 km || 
|-id=203 bgcolor=#E9E9E9
| 62203 ||  || — || September 24, 2000 || Socorro || LINEAR || — || align=right | 7.9 km || 
|-id=204 bgcolor=#E9E9E9
| 62204 ||  || — || September 24, 2000 || Socorro || LINEAR || NEM || align=right | 5.2 km || 
|-id=205 bgcolor=#fefefe
| 62205 ||  || — || September 24, 2000 || Socorro || LINEAR || NYS || align=right | 1.4 km || 
|-id=206 bgcolor=#d6d6d6
| 62206 ||  || — || September 24, 2000 || Socorro || LINEAR || — || align=right | 5.2 km || 
|-id=207 bgcolor=#E9E9E9
| 62207 ||  || — || September 24, 2000 || Socorro || LINEAR || — || align=right | 2.0 km || 
|-id=208 bgcolor=#E9E9E9
| 62208 ||  || — || September 24, 2000 || Socorro || LINEAR || AGN || align=right | 2.7 km || 
|-id=209 bgcolor=#E9E9E9
| 62209 ||  || — || September 24, 2000 || Socorro || LINEAR || — || align=right | 2.8 km || 
|-id=210 bgcolor=#E9E9E9
| 62210 ||  || — || September 24, 2000 || Socorro || LINEAR || — || align=right | 2.2 km || 
|-id=211 bgcolor=#E9E9E9
| 62211 ||  || — || September 24, 2000 || Socorro || LINEAR || — || align=right | 5.2 km || 
|-id=212 bgcolor=#fefefe
| 62212 ||  || — || September 24, 2000 || Socorro || LINEAR || — || align=right | 2.3 km || 
|-id=213 bgcolor=#d6d6d6
| 62213 ||  || — || September 24, 2000 || Socorro || LINEAR || — || align=right | 5.3 km || 
|-id=214 bgcolor=#E9E9E9
| 62214 ||  || — || September 24, 2000 || Socorro || LINEAR || — || align=right | 2.3 km || 
|-id=215 bgcolor=#E9E9E9
| 62215 ||  || — || September 24, 2000 || Socorro || LINEAR || — || align=right | 5.7 km || 
|-id=216 bgcolor=#fefefe
| 62216 ||  || — || September 24, 2000 || Socorro || LINEAR || NYS || align=right | 4.1 km || 
|-id=217 bgcolor=#E9E9E9
| 62217 ||  || — || September 24, 2000 || Socorro || LINEAR || EUN || align=right | 2.3 km || 
|-id=218 bgcolor=#E9E9E9
| 62218 ||  || — || September 24, 2000 || Socorro || LINEAR || — || align=right | 2.3 km || 
|-id=219 bgcolor=#d6d6d6
| 62219 ||  || — || September 24, 2000 || Socorro || LINEAR || — || align=right | 5.7 km || 
|-id=220 bgcolor=#d6d6d6
| 62220 ||  || — || September 24, 2000 || Socorro || LINEAR || EOS || align=right | 5.2 km || 
|-id=221 bgcolor=#E9E9E9
| 62221 ||  || — || September 24, 2000 || Socorro || LINEAR || — || align=right | 4.5 km || 
|-id=222 bgcolor=#E9E9E9
| 62222 ||  || — || September 24, 2000 || Socorro || LINEAR || MAR || align=right | 2.1 km || 
|-id=223 bgcolor=#E9E9E9
| 62223 ||  || — || September 24, 2000 || Socorro || LINEAR || — || align=right | 5.0 km || 
|-id=224 bgcolor=#E9E9E9
| 62224 ||  || — || September 24, 2000 || Socorro || LINEAR || — || align=right | 2.4 km || 
|-id=225 bgcolor=#fefefe
| 62225 ||  || — || September 24, 2000 || Socorro || LINEAR || NYS || align=right | 1.9 km || 
|-id=226 bgcolor=#d6d6d6
| 62226 ||  || — || September 24, 2000 || Socorro || LINEAR || KOR || align=right | 3.3 km || 
|-id=227 bgcolor=#fefefe
| 62227 ||  || — || September 24, 2000 || Socorro || LINEAR || V || align=right | 1.3 km || 
|-id=228 bgcolor=#fefefe
| 62228 ||  || — || September 24, 2000 || Socorro || LINEAR || MAS || align=right | 1.8 km || 
|-id=229 bgcolor=#E9E9E9
| 62229 ||  || — || September 24, 2000 || Socorro || LINEAR || HEN || align=right | 2.4 km || 
|-id=230 bgcolor=#E9E9E9
| 62230 ||  || — || September 24, 2000 || Socorro || LINEAR || HOF || align=right | 6.0 km || 
|-id=231 bgcolor=#E9E9E9
| 62231 ||  || — || September 24, 2000 || Socorro || LINEAR || — || align=right | 5.2 km || 
|-id=232 bgcolor=#E9E9E9
| 62232 ||  || — || September 24, 2000 || Socorro || LINEAR || MAR || align=right | 2.7 km || 
|-id=233 bgcolor=#E9E9E9
| 62233 ||  || — || September 24, 2000 || Socorro || LINEAR || — || align=right | 5.0 km || 
|-id=234 bgcolor=#d6d6d6
| 62234 ||  || — || September 24, 2000 || Socorro || LINEAR || KOR || align=right | 3.3 km || 
|-id=235 bgcolor=#fefefe
| 62235 ||  || — || September 24, 2000 || Socorro || LINEAR || NYS || align=right | 1.7 km || 
|-id=236 bgcolor=#d6d6d6
| 62236 ||  || — || September 24, 2000 || Socorro || LINEAR || — || align=right | 7.4 km || 
|-id=237 bgcolor=#fefefe
| 62237 ||  || — || September 24, 2000 || Socorro || LINEAR || — || align=right | 1.9 km || 
|-id=238 bgcolor=#E9E9E9
| 62238 ||  || — || September 24, 2000 || Socorro || LINEAR || — || align=right | 4.3 km || 
|-id=239 bgcolor=#E9E9E9
| 62239 ||  || — || September 24, 2000 || Socorro || LINEAR || GEF || align=right | 3.5 km || 
|-id=240 bgcolor=#fefefe
| 62240 ||  || — || September 24, 2000 || Socorro || LINEAR || — || align=right | 1.9 km || 
|-id=241 bgcolor=#d6d6d6
| 62241 ||  || — || September 24, 2000 || Socorro || LINEAR || 3:2 || align=right | 12 km || 
|-id=242 bgcolor=#fefefe
| 62242 ||  || — || September 24, 2000 || Socorro || LINEAR || NYS || align=right | 1.6 km || 
|-id=243 bgcolor=#d6d6d6
| 62243 ||  || — || September 24, 2000 || Socorro || LINEAR || EOS || align=right | 5.6 km || 
|-id=244 bgcolor=#d6d6d6
| 62244 ||  || — || September 24, 2000 || Socorro || LINEAR || 3:2 || align=right | 10 km || 
|-id=245 bgcolor=#E9E9E9
| 62245 ||  || — || September 24, 2000 || Socorro || LINEAR || HEN || align=right | 2.1 km || 
|-id=246 bgcolor=#E9E9E9
| 62246 ||  || — || September 24, 2000 || Socorro || LINEAR || — || align=right | 5.2 km || 
|-id=247 bgcolor=#E9E9E9
| 62247 ||  || — || September 24, 2000 || Socorro || LINEAR || HEN || align=right | 2.4 km || 
|-id=248 bgcolor=#d6d6d6
| 62248 ||  || — || September 24, 2000 || Socorro || LINEAR || — || align=right | 11 km || 
|-id=249 bgcolor=#E9E9E9
| 62249 ||  || — || September 24, 2000 || Socorro || LINEAR || — || align=right | 2.0 km || 
|-id=250 bgcolor=#E9E9E9
| 62250 ||  || — || September 24, 2000 || Socorro || LINEAR || — || align=right | 3.8 km || 
|-id=251 bgcolor=#d6d6d6
| 62251 ||  || — || September 24, 2000 || Socorro || LINEAR || — || align=right | 3.1 km || 
|-id=252 bgcolor=#E9E9E9
| 62252 ||  || — || September 24, 2000 || Socorro || LINEAR || — || align=right | 4.9 km || 
|-id=253 bgcolor=#d6d6d6
| 62253 ||  || — || September 24, 2000 || Socorro || LINEAR || EOS || align=right | 3.8 km || 
|-id=254 bgcolor=#E9E9E9
| 62254 ||  || — || September 24, 2000 || Socorro || LINEAR || — || align=right | 1.7 km || 
|-id=255 bgcolor=#E9E9E9
| 62255 ||  || — || September 24, 2000 || Socorro || LINEAR || AST || align=right | 3.8 km || 
|-id=256 bgcolor=#E9E9E9
| 62256 ||  || — || September 24, 2000 || Socorro || LINEAR || RAF || align=right | 1.4 km || 
|-id=257 bgcolor=#d6d6d6
| 62257 ||  || — || September 24, 2000 || Socorro || LINEAR || — || align=right | 6.0 km || 
|-id=258 bgcolor=#d6d6d6
| 62258 ||  || — || September 24, 2000 || Socorro || LINEAR || 628 || align=right | 4.5 km || 
|-id=259 bgcolor=#E9E9E9
| 62259 ||  || — || September 24, 2000 || Socorro || LINEAR || HOF || align=right | 6.4 km || 
|-id=260 bgcolor=#E9E9E9
| 62260 ||  || — || September 24, 2000 || Socorro || LINEAR || — || align=right | 7.3 km || 
|-id=261 bgcolor=#fefefe
| 62261 ||  || — || September 24, 2000 || Socorro || LINEAR || — || align=right | 2.1 km || 
|-id=262 bgcolor=#d6d6d6
| 62262 ||  || — || September 24, 2000 || Socorro || LINEAR || — || align=right | 8.1 km || 
|-id=263 bgcolor=#E9E9E9
| 62263 ||  || — || September 24, 2000 || Socorro || LINEAR || — || align=right | 3.6 km || 
|-id=264 bgcolor=#d6d6d6
| 62264 ||  || — || September 24, 2000 || Socorro || LINEAR || — || align=right | 7.2 km || 
|-id=265 bgcolor=#d6d6d6
| 62265 ||  || — || September 25, 2000 || Socorro || LINEAR || — || align=right | 10 km || 
|-id=266 bgcolor=#fefefe
| 62266 ||  || — || September 25, 2000 || Socorro || LINEAR || V || align=right | 1.3 km || 
|-id=267 bgcolor=#E9E9E9
| 62267 ||  || — || September 22, 2000 || Socorro || LINEAR || — || align=right | 4.9 km || 
|-id=268 bgcolor=#FA8072
| 62268 ||  || — || September 22, 2000 || Socorro || LINEAR || — || align=right | 4.6 km || 
|-id=269 bgcolor=#d6d6d6
| 62269 ||  || — || September 22, 2000 || Socorro || LINEAR || FIR || align=right | 17 km || 
|-id=270 bgcolor=#d6d6d6
| 62270 ||  || — || September 23, 2000 || Socorro || LINEAR || — || align=right | 5.7 km || 
|-id=271 bgcolor=#E9E9E9
| 62271 ||  || — || September 23, 2000 || Socorro || LINEAR || — || align=right | 4.1 km || 
|-id=272 bgcolor=#E9E9E9
| 62272 ||  || — || September 23, 2000 || Socorro || LINEAR || — || align=right | 4.7 km || 
|-id=273 bgcolor=#d6d6d6
| 62273 ||  || — || September 23, 2000 || Socorro || LINEAR || — || align=right | 6.9 km || 
|-id=274 bgcolor=#E9E9E9
| 62274 ||  || — || September 23, 2000 || Socorro || LINEAR || — || align=right | 5.3 km || 
|-id=275 bgcolor=#d6d6d6
| 62275 ||  || — || September 23, 2000 || Socorro || LINEAR || — || align=right | 4.4 km || 
|-id=276 bgcolor=#E9E9E9
| 62276 ||  || — || September 23, 2000 || Socorro || LINEAR || — || align=right | 3.2 km || 
|-id=277 bgcolor=#d6d6d6
| 62277 ||  || — || September 23, 2000 || Socorro || LINEAR || — || align=right | 9.3 km || 
|-id=278 bgcolor=#d6d6d6
| 62278 ||  || — || September 24, 2000 || Socorro || LINEAR || — || align=right | 4.7 km || 
|-id=279 bgcolor=#fefefe
| 62279 ||  || — || September 24, 2000 || Socorro || LINEAR || NYS || align=right | 4.4 km || 
|-id=280 bgcolor=#fefefe
| 62280 ||  || — || September 24, 2000 || Socorro || LINEAR || — || align=right | 1.8 km || 
|-id=281 bgcolor=#E9E9E9
| 62281 ||  || — || September 24, 2000 || Socorro || LINEAR || — || align=right | 5.2 km || 
|-id=282 bgcolor=#d6d6d6
| 62282 ||  || — || September 24, 2000 || Socorro || LINEAR || — || align=right | 6.9 km || 
|-id=283 bgcolor=#E9E9E9
| 62283 ||  || — || September 24, 2000 || Socorro || LINEAR || — || align=right | 4.3 km || 
|-id=284 bgcolor=#d6d6d6
| 62284 ||  || — || September 24, 2000 || Socorro || LINEAR || — || align=right | 3.4 km || 
|-id=285 bgcolor=#fefefe
| 62285 ||  || — || September 24, 2000 || Socorro || LINEAR || V || align=right | 2.5 km || 
|-id=286 bgcolor=#fefefe
| 62286 ||  || — || September 24, 2000 || Socorro || LINEAR || ERI || align=right | 4.7 km || 
|-id=287 bgcolor=#d6d6d6
| 62287 ||  || — || September 24, 2000 || Socorro || LINEAR || — || align=right | 8.6 km || 
|-id=288 bgcolor=#fefefe
| 62288 ||  || — || September 24, 2000 || Socorro || LINEAR || NYS || align=right | 2.8 km || 
|-id=289 bgcolor=#fefefe
| 62289 ||  || — || September 24, 2000 || Socorro || LINEAR || NYS || align=right | 2.5 km || 
|-id=290 bgcolor=#fefefe
| 62290 ||  || — || September 24, 2000 || Socorro || LINEAR || EUT || align=right | 1.1 km || 
|-id=291 bgcolor=#E9E9E9
| 62291 ||  || — || September 24, 2000 || Socorro || LINEAR || — || align=right | 3.5 km || 
|-id=292 bgcolor=#E9E9E9
| 62292 ||  || — || September 24, 2000 || Socorro || LINEAR || MRX || align=right | 2.4 km || 
|-id=293 bgcolor=#d6d6d6
| 62293 ||  || — || September 24, 2000 || Socorro || LINEAR || — || align=right | 2.6 km || 
|-id=294 bgcolor=#E9E9E9
| 62294 ||  || — || September 24, 2000 || Socorro || LINEAR || — || align=right | 5.4 km || 
|-id=295 bgcolor=#fefefe
| 62295 ||  || — || September 24, 2000 || Socorro || LINEAR || — || align=right | 1.9 km || 
|-id=296 bgcolor=#fefefe
| 62296 ||  || — || September 24, 2000 || Socorro || LINEAR || V || align=right | 1.6 km || 
|-id=297 bgcolor=#d6d6d6
| 62297 ||  || — || September 24, 2000 || Socorro || LINEAR || HYG || align=right | 7.9 km || 
|-id=298 bgcolor=#d6d6d6
| 62298 ||  || — || September 24, 2000 || Socorro || LINEAR || KOR || align=right | 3.5 km || 
|-id=299 bgcolor=#fefefe
| 62299 ||  || — || September 24, 2000 || Socorro || LINEAR || NYS || align=right | 5.1 km || 
|-id=300 bgcolor=#d6d6d6
| 62300 ||  || — || September 24, 2000 || Socorro || LINEAR || — || align=right | 13 km || 
|}

62301–62400 

|-bgcolor=#fefefe
| 62301 ||  || — || September 24, 2000 || Socorro || LINEAR || NYS || align=right | 1.7 km || 
|-id=302 bgcolor=#fefefe
| 62302 ||  || — || September 24, 2000 || Socorro || LINEAR || FLO || align=right | 2.9 km || 
|-id=303 bgcolor=#d6d6d6
| 62303 ||  || — || September 24, 2000 || Socorro || LINEAR || — || align=right | 8.0 km || 
|-id=304 bgcolor=#E9E9E9
| 62304 ||  || — || September 24, 2000 || Socorro || LINEAR || — || align=right | 2.4 km || 
|-id=305 bgcolor=#E9E9E9
| 62305 ||  || — || September 24, 2000 || Socorro || LINEAR || AGN || align=right | 2.9 km || 
|-id=306 bgcolor=#E9E9E9
| 62306 ||  || — || September 24, 2000 || Socorro || LINEAR || PAD || align=right | 5.9 km || 
|-id=307 bgcolor=#E9E9E9
| 62307 ||  || — || September 24, 2000 || Socorro || LINEAR || — || align=right | 5.5 km || 
|-id=308 bgcolor=#d6d6d6
| 62308 ||  || — || September 24, 2000 || Socorro || LINEAR || — || align=right | 8.5 km || 
|-id=309 bgcolor=#fefefe
| 62309 ||  || — || September 24, 2000 || Socorro || LINEAR || V || align=right | 2.1 km || 
|-id=310 bgcolor=#E9E9E9
| 62310 ||  || — || September 24, 2000 || Socorro || LINEAR || — || align=right | 3.6 km || 
|-id=311 bgcolor=#d6d6d6
| 62311 ||  || — || September 24, 2000 || Socorro || LINEAR || — || align=right | 4.8 km || 
|-id=312 bgcolor=#fefefe
| 62312 ||  || — || September 24, 2000 || Socorro || LINEAR || — || align=right | 3.9 km || 
|-id=313 bgcolor=#E9E9E9
| 62313 ||  || — || September 24, 2000 || Socorro || LINEAR || — || align=right | 3.0 km || 
|-id=314 bgcolor=#d6d6d6
| 62314 ||  || — || September 24, 2000 || Socorro || LINEAR || EOS || align=right | 5.2 km || 
|-id=315 bgcolor=#E9E9E9
| 62315 ||  || — || September 24, 2000 || Socorro || LINEAR || NEM || align=right | 6.9 km || 
|-id=316 bgcolor=#d6d6d6
| 62316 ||  || — || September 24, 2000 || Socorro || LINEAR || HYG || align=right | 5.6 km || 
|-id=317 bgcolor=#E9E9E9
| 62317 ||  || — || September 24, 2000 || Socorro || LINEAR || NEM || align=right | 5.1 km || 
|-id=318 bgcolor=#E9E9E9
| 62318 ||  || — || September 24, 2000 || Socorro || LINEAR || — || align=right | 3.5 km || 
|-id=319 bgcolor=#fefefe
| 62319 ||  || — || September 24, 2000 || Socorro || LINEAR || NYS || align=right | 1.7 km || 
|-id=320 bgcolor=#E9E9E9
| 62320 ||  || — || September 24, 2000 || Socorro || LINEAR || GEF || align=right | 2.8 km || 
|-id=321 bgcolor=#E9E9E9
| 62321 ||  || — || September 24, 2000 || Socorro || LINEAR || — || align=right | 5.3 km || 
|-id=322 bgcolor=#E9E9E9
| 62322 ||  || — || September 24, 2000 || Socorro || LINEAR || — || align=right | 3.3 km || 
|-id=323 bgcolor=#E9E9E9
| 62323 ||  || — || September 24, 2000 || Socorro || LINEAR || — || align=right | 5.8 km || 
|-id=324 bgcolor=#d6d6d6
| 62324 ||  || — || September 24, 2000 || Socorro || LINEAR || — || align=right | 7.2 km || 
|-id=325 bgcolor=#E9E9E9
| 62325 ||  || — || September 24, 2000 || Socorro || LINEAR || — || align=right | 6.9 km || 
|-id=326 bgcolor=#E9E9E9
| 62326 ||  || — || September 24, 2000 || Socorro || LINEAR || — || align=right | 2.6 km || 
|-id=327 bgcolor=#d6d6d6
| 62327 ||  || — || September 24, 2000 || Socorro || LINEAR || — || align=right | 4.8 km || 
|-id=328 bgcolor=#E9E9E9
| 62328 ||  || — || September 24, 2000 || Socorro || LINEAR || — || align=right | 3.4 km || 
|-id=329 bgcolor=#E9E9E9
| 62329 ||  || — || September 24, 2000 || Socorro || LINEAR || — || align=right | 2.3 km || 
|-id=330 bgcolor=#d6d6d6
| 62330 ||  || — || September 24, 2000 || Socorro || LINEAR || HYG || align=right | 9.0 km || 
|-id=331 bgcolor=#d6d6d6
| 62331 ||  || — || September 24, 2000 || Socorro || LINEAR || KOR || align=right | 3.6 km || 
|-id=332 bgcolor=#fefefe
| 62332 ||  || — || September 24, 2000 || Socorro || LINEAR || — || align=right | 3.5 km || 
|-id=333 bgcolor=#d6d6d6
| 62333 ||  || — || September 24, 2000 || Socorro || LINEAR || EOS || align=right | 3.9 km || 
|-id=334 bgcolor=#fefefe
| 62334 ||  || — || September 24, 2000 || Socorro || LINEAR || NYS || align=right | 1.5 km || 
|-id=335 bgcolor=#fefefe
| 62335 ||  || — || September 24, 2000 || Socorro || LINEAR || MAS || align=right | 1.9 km || 
|-id=336 bgcolor=#d6d6d6
| 62336 ||  || — || September 24, 2000 || Socorro || LINEAR || — || align=right | 6.4 km || 
|-id=337 bgcolor=#d6d6d6
| 62337 ||  || — || September 24, 2000 || Socorro || LINEAR || — || align=right | 5.3 km || 
|-id=338 bgcolor=#E9E9E9
| 62338 ||  || — || September 24, 2000 || Socorro || LINEAR || — || align=right | 3.8 km || 
|-id=339 bgcolor=#E9E9E9
| 62339 ||  || — || September 22, 2000 || Socorro || LINEAR || — || align=right | 2.9 km || 
|-id=340 bgcolor=#d6d6d6
| 62340 ||  || — || September 22, 2000 || Socorro || LINEAR || FIRslow || align=right | 6.9 km || 
|-id=341 bgcolor=#E9E9E9
| 62341 ||  || — || September 22, 2000 || Socorro || LINEAR || — || align=right | 3.0 km || 
|-id=342 bgcolor=#E9E9E9
| 62342 ||  || — || September 22, 2000 || Socorro || LINEAR || — || align=right | 3.4 km || 
|-id=343 bgcolor=#E9E9E9
| 62343 ||  || — || September 22, 2000 || Socorro || LINEAR || HNS || align=right | 3.3 km || 
|-id=344 bgcolor=#d6d6d6
| 62344 ||  || — || September 23, 2000 || Socorro || LINEAR || — || align=right | 3.9 km || 
|-id=345 bgcolor=#d6d6d6
| 62345 ||  || — || September 23, 2000 || Socorro || LINEAR || EOS || align=right | 4.3 km || 
|-id=346 bgcolor=#d6d6d6
| 62346 ||  || — || September 23, 2000 || Socorro || LINEAR || — || align=right | 6.7 km || 
|-id=347 bgcolor=#d6d6d6
| 62347 ||  || — || September 23, 2000 || Socorro || LINEAR || — || align=right | 8.2 km || 
|-id=348 bgcolor=#d6d6d6
| 62348 ||  || — || September 23, 2000 || Socorro || LINEAR || EOS || align=right | 5.8 km || 
|-id=349 bgcolor=#d6d6d6
| 62349 ||  || — || September 23, 2000 || Socorro || LINEAR || EOS || align=right | 5.4 km || 
|-id=350 bgcolor=#E9E9E9
| 62350 ||  || — || September 23, 2000 || Socorro || LINEAR || — || align=right | 3.6 km || 
|-id=351 bgcolor=#fefefe
| 62351 ||  || — || September 23, 2000 || Socorro || LINEAR || — || align=right | 1.7 km || 
|-id=352 bgcolor=#d6d6d6
| 62352 ||  || — || September 23, 2000 || Socorro || LINEAR || VER || align=right | 8.0 km || 
|-id=353 bgcolor=#d6d6d6
| 62353 ||  || — || September 23, 2000 || Socorro || LINEAR || ALA || align=right | 10 km || 
|-id=354 bgcolor=#d6d6d6
| 62354 ||  || — || September 24, 2000 || Socorro || LINEAR || EOS || align=right | 3.7 km || 
|-id=355 bgcolor=#d6d6d6
| 62355 ||  || — || September 24, 2000 || Socorro || LINEAR || — || align=right | 5.0 km || 
|-id=356 bgcolor=#E9E9E9
| 62356 ||  || — || September 24, 2000 || Socorro || LINEAR || — || align=right | 4.8 km || 
|-id=357 bgcolor=#d6d6d6
| 62357 ||  || — || September 24, 2000 || Socorro || LINEAR || — || align=right | 4.7 km || 
|-id=358 bgcolor=#E9E9E9
| 62358 ||  || — || September 24, 2000 || Socorro || LINEAR || — || align=right | 5.5 km || 
|-id=359 bgcolor=#d6d6d6
| 62359 ||  || — || September 24, 2000 || Socorro || LINEAR || — || align=right | 6.0 km || 
|-id=360 bgcolor=#fefefe
| 62360 ||  || — || September 24, 2000 || Socorro || LINEAR || V || align=right | 1.8 km || 
|-id=361 bgcolor=#fefefe
| 62361 ||  || — || September 24, 2000 || Socorro || LINEAR || NYS || align=right | 2.5 km || 
|-id=362 bgcolor=#fefefe
| 62362 ||  || — || September 24, 2000 || Socorro || LINEAR || MAS || align=right | 1.7 km || 
|-id=363 bgcolor=#d6d6d6
| 62363 ||  || — || September 24, 2000 || Socorro || LINEAR || — || align=right | 3.6 km || 
|-id=364 bgcolor=#d6d6d6
| 62364 ||  || — || September 24, 2000 || Socorro || LINEAR || — || align=right | 9.2 km || 
|-id=365 bgcolor=#E9E9E9
| 62365 ||  || — || September 24, 2000 || Socorro || LINEAR || GEF || align=right | 2.7 km || 
|-id=366 bgcolor=#E9E9E9
| 62366 ||  || — || September 24, 2000 || Socorro || LINEAR || — || align=right | 2.4 km || 
|-id=367 bgcolor=#d6d6d6
| 62367 ||  || — || September 24, 2000 || Socorro || LINEAR || — || align=right | 3.0 km || 
|-id=368 bgcolor=#d6d6d6
| 62368 ||  || — || September 24, 2000 || Socorro || LINEAR || — || align=right | 5.9 km || 
|-id=369 bgcolor=#E9E9E9
| 62369 ||  || — || September 24, 2000 || Socorro || LINEAR || — || align=right | 4.4 km || 
|-id=370 bgcolor=#fefefe
| 62370 ||  || — || September 24, 2000 || Socorro || LINEAR || ERI || align=right | 4.2 km || 
|-id=371 bgcolor=#d6d6d6
| 62371 ||  || — || September 24, 2000 || Socorro || LINEAR || — || align=right | 3.3 km || 
|-id=372 bgcolor=#E9E9E9
| 62372 ||  || — || September 24, 2000 || Socorro || LINEAR || — || align=right | 6.4 km || 
|-id=373 bgcolor=#d6d6d6
| 62373 ||  || — || September 24, 2000 || Socorro || LINEAR || — || align=right | 6.8 km || 
|-id=374 bgcolor=#d6d6d6
| 62374 ||  || — || September 24, 2000 || Socorro || LINEAR || CRO || align=right | 8.6 km || 
|-id=375 bgcolor=#fefefe
| 62375 ||  || — || September 24, 2000 || Socorro || LINEAR || — || align=right | 2.2 km || 
|-id=376 bgcolor=#d6d6d6
| 62376 ||  || — || September 24, 2000 || Socorro || LINEAR || TEL || align=right | 3.5 km || 
|-id=377 bgcolor=#E9E9E9
| 62377 ||  || — || September 24, 2000 || Socorro || LINEAR || EUN || align=right | 3.7 km || 
|-id=378 bgcolor=#fefefe
| 62378 ||  || — || September 24, 2000 || Socorro || LINEAR || NYS || align=right | 1.8 km || 
|-id=379 bgcolor=#d6d6d6
| 62379 ||  || — || September 24, 2000 || Socorro || LINEAR || — || align=right | 5.2 km || 
|-id=380 bgcolor=#d6d6d6
| 62380 ||  || — || September 24, 2000 || Socorro || LINEAR || — || align=right | 9.9 km || 
|-id=381 bgcolor=#d6d6d6
| 62381 ||  || — || September 24, 2000 || Socorro || LINEAR || — || align=right | 9.3 km || 
|-id=382 bgcolor=#d6d6d6
| 62382 ||  || — || September 24, 2000 || Socorro || LINEAR || — || align=right | 6.6 km || 
|-id=383 bgcolor=#d6d6d6
| 62383 ||  || — || September 24, 2000 || Socorro || LINEAR || EOS || align=right | 4.3 km || 
|-id=384 bgcolor=#d6d6d6
| 62384 ||  || — || September 26, 2000 || Socorro || LINEAR || — || align=right | 7.0 km || 
|-id=385 bgcolor=#E9E9E9
| 62385 ||  || — || September 27, 2000 || Socorro || LINEAR || — || align=right | 4.2 km || 
|-id=386 bgcolor=#E9E9E9
| 62386 ||  || — || September 20, 2000 || Haleakala || NEAT || — || align=right | 5.5 km || 
|-id=387 bgcolor=#E9E9E9
| 62387 ||  || — || September 22, 2000 || Haleakala || NEAT || MAR || align=right | 2.8 km || 
|-id=388 bgcolor=#E9E9E9
| 62388 ||  || — || September 30, 2000 || Elmira || A. J. Cecce || RAF || align=right | 2.8 km || 
|-id=389 bgcolor=#E9E9E9
| 62389 ||  || — || September 23, 2000 || Socorro || LINEAR || EUN || align=right | 5.2 km || 
|-id=390 bgcolor=#E9E9E9
| 62390 ||  || — || September 23, 2000 || Socorro || LINEAR || MAR || align=right | 4.6 km || 
|-id=391 bgcolor=#d6d6d6
| 62391 ||  || — || September 23, 2000 || Socorro || LINEAR || — || align=right | 6.7 km || 
|-id=392 bgcolor=#E9E9E9
| 62392 ||  || — || September 23, 2000 || Socorro || LINEAR || RAF || align=right | 4.0 km || 
|-id=393 bgcolor=#E9E9E9
| 62393 ||  || — || September 24, 2000 || Socorro || LINEAR || — || align=right | 4.5 km || 
|-id=394 bgcolor=#E9E9E9
| 62394 ||  || — || September 24, 2000 || Socorro || LINEAR || MAR || align=right | 4.3 km || 
|-id=395 bgcolor=#E9E9E9
| 62395 ||  || — || September 24, 2000 || Socorro || LINEAR || MAR || align=right | 3.3 km || 
|-id=396 bgcolor=#E9E9E9
| 62396 ||  || — || September 24, 2000 || Socorro || LINEAR || EUN || align=right | 5.2 km || 
|-id=397 bgcolor=#d6d6d6
| 62397 ||  || — || September 24, 2000 || Socorro || LINEAR || BRA || align=right | 5.0 km || 
|-id=398 bgcolor=#d6d6d6
| 62398 ||  || — || September 24, 2000 || Socorro || LINEAR || — || align=right | 5.2 km || 
|-id=399 bgcolor=#E9E9E9
| 62399 ||  || — || September 24, 2000 || Socorro || LINEAR || — || align=right | 2.2 km || 
|-id=400 bgcolor=#E9E9E9
| 62400 ||  || — || September 24, 2000 || Socorro || LINEAR || RAF || align=right | 2.2 km || 
|}

62401–62500 

|-bgcolor=#fefefe
| 62401 ||  || — || September 24, 2000 || Socorro || LINEAR || — || align=right | 2.2 km || 
|-id=402 bgcolor=#E9E9E9
| 62402 ||  || — || September 24, 2000 || Socorro || LINEAR || — || align=right | 5.0 km || 
|-id=403 bgcolor=#d6d6d6
| 62403 ||  || — || September 27, 2000 || Socorro || LINEAR || — || align=right | 7.5 km || 
|-id=404 bgcolor=#E9E9E9
| 62404 ||  || — || September 28, 2000 || Socorro || LINEAR || MAR || align=right | 4.1 km || 
|-id=405 bgcolor=#d6d6d6
| 62405 ||  || — || September 28, 2000 || Socorro || LINEAR || — || align=right | 6.0 km || 
|-id=406 bgcolor=#fefefe
| 62406 ||  || — || September 28, 2000 || Socorro || LINEAR || V || align=right | 3.0 km || 
|-id=407 bgcolor=#fefefe
| 62407 ||  || — || September 28, 2000 || Socorro || LINEAR || — || align=right | 1.9 km || 
|-id=408 bgcolor=#d6d6d6
| 62408 ||  || — || September 28, 2000 || Socorro || LINEAR || HIL3:2 || align=right | 12 km || 
|-id=409 bgcolor=#d6d6d6
| 62409 ||  || — || September 28, 2000 || Socorro || LINEAR || EOS || align=right | 5.6 km || 
|-id=410 bgcolor=#E9E9E9
| 62410 ||  || — || September 28, 2000 || Socorro || LINEAR || — || align=right | 4.8 km || 
|-id=411 bgcolor=#fefefe
| 62411 ||  || — || September 28, 2000 || Socorro || LINEAR || V || align=right | 2.2 km || 
|-id=412 bgcolor=#d6d6d6
| 62412 ||  || — || September 28, 2000 || Socorro || LINEAR || HYG || align=right | 10 km || 
|-id=413 bgcolor=#d6d6d6
| 62413 ||  || — || September 28, 2000 || Socorro || LINEAR || — || align=right | 6.8 km || 
|-id=414 bgcolor=#fefefe
| 62414 ||  || — || September 28, 2000 || Socorro || LINEAR || — || align=right | 2.2 km || 
|-id=415 bgcolor=#d6d6d6
| 62415 ||  || — || September 28, 2000 || Socorro || LINEAR || — || align=right | 5.7 km || 
|-id=416 bgcolor=#E9E9E9
| 62416 ||  || — || September 28, 2000 || Socorro || LINEAR || — || align=right | 5.9 km || 
|-id=417 bgcolor=#E9E9E9
| 62417 ||  || — || September 19, 2000 || Haleakala || NEAT || — || align=right | 5.8 km || 
|-id=418 bgcolor=#E9E9E9
| 62418 ||  || — || September 20, 2000 || Socorro || LINEAR || WAT || align=right | 4.3 km || 
|-id=419 bgcolor=#d6d6d6
| 62419 ||  || — || September 20, 2000 || Haleakala || NEAT || — || align=right | 4.7 km || 
|-id=420 bgcolor=#E9E9E9
| 62420 ||  || — || September 20, 2000 || Haleakala || NEAT || — || align=right | 2.8 km || 
|-id=421 bgcolor=#d6d6d6
| 62421 ||  || — || September 20, 2000 || Haleakala || NEAT || — || align=right | 6.0 km || 
|-id=422 bgcolor=#fefefe
| 62422 ||  || — || September 20, 2000 || Haleakala || NEAT || V || align=right | 1.5 km || 
|-id=423 bgcolor=#d6d6d6
| 62423 ||  || — || September 20, 2000 || Haleakala || NEAT || TEL || align=right | 3.4 km || 
|-id=424 bgcolor=#d6d6d6
| 62424 ||  || — || September 20, 2000 || Haleakala || NEAT || — || align=right | 9.0 km || 
|-id=425 bgcolor=#d6d6d6
| 62425 ||  || — || September 21, 2000 || Haleakala || NEAT || — || align=right | 5.4 km || 
|-id=426 bgcolor=#C2FFFF
| 62426 ||  || — || September 21, 2000 || Haleakala || NEAT || L5 || align=right | 26 km || 
|-id=427 bgcolor=#E9E9E9
| 62427 ||  || — || September 21, 2000 || Haleakala || NEAT || — || align=right | 5.7 km || 
|-id=428 bgcolor=#E9E9E9
| 62428 ||  || — || September 21, 2000 || Haleakala || NEAT || — || align=right | 2.0 km || 
|-id=429 bgcolor=#E9E9E9
| 62429 ||  || — || September 21, 2000 || Haleakala || NEAT || — || align=right | 6.2 km || 
|-id=430 bgcolor=#d6d6d6
| 62430 ||  || — || September 21, 2000 || Haleakala || NEAT || — || align=right | 11 km || 
|-id=431 bgcolor=#d6d6d6
| 62431 ||  || — || September 21, 2000 || Haleakala || NEAT || — || align=right | 5.7 km || 
|-id=432 bgcolor=#d6d6d6
| 62432 ||  || — || September 21, 2000 || Haleakala || NEAT || THM || align=right | 8.7 km || 
|-id=433 bgcolor=#fefefe
| 62433 ||  || — || September 21, 2000 || Haleakala || NEAT || NYS || align=right | 1.8 km || 
|-id=434 bgcolor=#d6d6d6
| 62434 ||  || — || September 22, 2000 || Haleakala || NEAT || — || align=right | 7.7 km || 
|-id=435 bgcolor=#E9E9E9
| 62435 ||  || — || September 23, 2000 || Socorro || LINEAR || — || align=right | 5.2 km || 
|-id=436 bgcolor=#d6d6d6
| 62436 ||  || — || September 24, 2000 || Socorro || LINEAR || EOS || align=right | 4.5 km || 
|-id=437 bgcolor=#E9E9E9
| 62437 ||  || — || September 24, 2000 || Socorro || LINEAR || — || align=right | 4.4 km || 
|-id=438 bgcolor=#d6d6d6
| 62438 ||  || — || September 24, 2000 || Socorro || LINEAR || — || align=right | 4.8 km || 
|-id=439 bgcolor=#E9E9E9
| 62439 ||  || — || September 24, 2000 || Socorro || LINEAR || — || align=right | 4.8 km || 
|-id=440 bgcolor=#E9E9E9
| 62440 ||  || — || September 24, 2000 || Socorro || LINEAR || — || align=right | 4.2 km || 
|-id=441 bgcolor=#d6d6d6
| 62441 ||  || — || September 24, 2000 || Socorro || LINEAR || KOR || align=right | 3.0 km || 
|-id=442 bgcolor=#d6d6d6
| 62442 ||  || — || September 24, 2000 || Socorro || LINEAR || — || align=right | 5.2 km || 
|-id=443 bgcolor=#fefefe
| 62443 ||  || — || September 24, 2000 || Socorro || LINEAR || NYS || align=right | 1.4 km || 
|-id=444 bgcolor=#E9E9E9
| 62444 ||  || — || September 24, 2000 || Socorro || LINEAR || XIZ || align=right | 3.1 km || 
|-id=445 bgcolor=#fefefe
| 62445 ||  || — || September 24, 2000 || Socorro || LINEAR || V || align=right | 1.6 km || 
|-id=446 bgcolor=#E9E9E9
| 62446 ||  || — || September 24, 2000 || Socorro || LINEAR || AGN || align=right | 3.4 km || 
|-id=447 bgcolor=#fefefe
| 62447 ||  || — || September 24, 2000 || Socorro || LINEAR || — || align=right | 1.7 km || 
|-id=448 bgcolor=#E9E9E9
| 62448 ||  || — || September 24, 2000 || Socorro || LINEAR || — || align=right | 2.3 km || 
|-id=449 bgcolor=#E9E9E9
| 62449 ||  || — || September 24, 2000 || Socorro || LINEAR || MRX || align=right | 2.3 km || 
|-id=450 bgcolor=#d6d6d6
| 62450 ||  || — || September 24, 2000 || Socorro || LINEAR || — || align=right | 7.2 km || 
|-id=451 bgcolor=#E9E9E9
| 62451 ||  || — || September 25, 2000 || Socorro || LINEAR || — || align=right | 3.3 km || 
|-id=452 bgcolor=#E9E9E9
| 62452 ||  || — || September 25, 2000 || Socorro || LINEAR || — || align=right | 6.9 km || 
|-id=453 bgcolor=#d6d6d6
| 62453 ||  || — || September 25, 2000 || Socorro || LINEAR || — || align=right | 5.2 km || 
|-id=454 bgcolor=#d6d6d6
| 62454 ||  || — || September 25, 2000 || Socorro || LINEAR || EOS || align=right | 5.8 km || 
|-id=455 bgcolor=#fefefe
| 62455 ||  || — || September 25, 2000 || Socorro || LINEAR || — || align=right | 1.9 km || 
|-id=456 bgcolor=#d6d6d6
| 62456 ||  || — || September 25, 2000 || Socorro || LINEAR || — || align=right | 5.8 km || 
|-id=457 bgcolor=#fefefe
| 62457 ||  || — || September 25, 2000 || Socorro || LINEAR || — || align=right | 2.6 km || 
|-id=458 bgcolor=#E9E9E9
| 62458 ||  || — || September 25, 2000 || Socorro || LINEAR || ADE || align=right | 6.1 km || 
|-id=459 bgcolor=#E9E9E9
| 62459 ||  || — || September 25, 2000 || Socorro || LINEAR || DOR || align=right | 5.4 km || 
|-id=460 bgcolor=#E9E9E9
| 62460 ||  || — || September 25, 2000 || Socorro || LINEAR || — || align=right | 3.2 km || 
|-id=461 bgcolor=#E9E9E9
| 62461 ||  || — || September 25, 2000 || Socorro || LINEAR || — || align=right | 5.7 km || 
|-id=462 bgcolor=#E9E9E9
| 62462 ||  || — || September 25, 2000 || Socorro || LINEAR || — || align=right | 3.9 km || 
|-id=463 bgcolor=#E9E9E9
| 62463 ||  || — || September 25, 2000 || Socorro || LINEAR || — || align=right | 3.5 km || 
|-id=464 bgcolor=#E9E9E9
| 62464 ||  || — || September 25, 2000 || Socorro || LINEAR || — || align=right | 5.8 km || 
|-id=465 bgcolor=#d6d6d6
| 62465 ||  || — || September 25, 2000 || Socorro || LINEAR || EOS || align=right | 5.0 km || 
|-id=466 bgcolor=#d6d6d6
| 62466 ||  || — || September 25, 2000 || Socorro || LINEAR || — || align=right | 8.0 km || 
|-id=467 bgcolor=#d6d6d6
| 62467 ||  || — || September 25, 2000 || Socorro || LINEAR || VER || align=right | 7.5 km || 
|-id=468 bgcolor=#E9E9E9
| 62468 ||  || — || September 25, 2000 || Socorro || LINEAR || — || align=right | 6.6 km || 
|-id=469 bgcolor=#E9E9E9
| 62469 ||  || — || September 26, 2000 || Socorro || LINEAR || — || align=right | 4.1 km || 
|-id=470 bgcolor=#d6d6d6
| 62470 ||  || — || September 26, 2000 || Socorro || LINEAR || — || align=right | 12 km || 
|-id=471 bgcolor=#fefefe
| 62471 ||  || — || September 26, 2000 || Socorro || LINEAR || FLO || align=right | 2.3 km || 
|-id=472 bgcolor=#E9E9E9
| 62472 ||  || — || September 26, 2000 || Socorro || LINEAR || DOR || align=right | 6.5 km || 
|-id=473 bgcolor=#d6d6d6
| 62473 ||  || — || September 26, 2000 || Socorro || LINEAR || EOS || align=right | 5.1 km || 
|-id=474 bgcolor=#E9E9E9
| 62474 ||  || — || September 26, 2000 || Socorro || LINEAR || DOR || align=right | 7.6 km || 
|-id=475 bgcolor=#d6d6d6
| 62475 ||  || — || September 26, 2000 || Socorro || LINEAR || ALA || align=right | 11 km || 
|-id=476 bgcolor=#d6d6d6
| 62476 ||  || — || September 26, 2000 || Socorro || LINEAR || — || align=right | 8.4 km || 
|-id=477 bgcolor=#E9E9E9
| 62477 ||  || — || September 26, 2000 || Socorro || LINEAR || — || align=right | 6.5 km || 
|-id=478 bgcolor=#E9E9E9
| 62478 ||  || — || September 26, 2000 || Socorro || LINEAR || — || align=right | 5.0 km || 
|-id=479 bgcolor=#d6d6d6
| 62479 ||  || — || September 26, 2000 || Socorro || LINEAR || — || align=right | 5.2 km || 
|-id=480 bgcolor=#d6d6d6
| 62480 ||  || — || September 26, 2000 || Socorro || LINEAR || LIX || align=right | 7.5 km || 
|-id=481 bgcolor=#d6d6d6
| 62481 ||  || — || September 26, 2000 || Socorro || LINEAR || ALA || align=right | 7.9 km || 
|-id=482 bgcolor=#E9E9E9
| 62482 ||  || — || September 26, 2000 || Socorro || LINEAR || — || align=right | 5.2 km || 
|-id=483 bgcolor=#d6d6d6
| 62483 ||  || — || September 26, 2000 || Socorro || LINEAR || SYL7:4 || align=right | 10 km || 
|-id=484 bgcolor=#E9E9E9
| 62484 ||  || — || September 26, 2000 || Socorro || LINEAR || GEF || align=right | 3.8 km || 
|-id=485 bgcolor=#E9E9E9
| 62485 ||  || — || September 26, 2000 || Socorro || LINEAR || — || align=right | 7.4 km || 
|-id=486 bgcolor=#E9E9E9
| 62486 ||  || — || September 26, 2000 || Socorro || LINEAR || — || align=right | 3.9 km || 
|-id=487 bgcolor=#E9E9E9
| 62487 ||  || — || September 26, 2000 || Socorro || LINEAR || GEF || align=right | 2.5 km || 
|-id=488 bgcolor=#E9E9E9
| 62488 ||  || — || September 27, 2000 || Socorro || LINEAR || HOF || align=right | 4.6 km || 
|-id=489 bgcolor=#d6d6d6
| 62489 ||  || — || September 27, 2000 || Socorro || LINEAR || SHU3:2 || align=right | 9.7 km || 
|-id=490 bgcolor=#d6d6d6
| 62490 ||  || — || September 27, 2000 || Socorro || LINEAR || THM || align=right | 4.6 km || 
|-id=491 bgcolor=#E9E9E9
| 62491 ||  || — || September 27, 2000 || Socorro || LINEAR || — || align=right | 3.0 km || 
|-id=492 bgcolor=#d6d6d6
| 62492 ||  || — || September 27, 2000 || Socorro || LINEAR || — || align=right | 7.0 km || 
|-id=493 bgcolor=#E9E9E9
| 62493 ||  || — || September 27, 2000 || Socorro || LINEAR || — || align=right | 5.7 km || 
|-id=494 bgcolor=#d6d6d6
| 62494 ||  || — || September 27, 2000 || Socorro || LINEAR || — || align=right | 5.1 km || 
|-id=495 bgcolor=#fefefe
| 62495 ||  || — || September 27, 2000 || Socorro || LINEAR || — || align=right | 2.2 km || 
|-id=496 bgcolor=#E9E9E9
| 62496 ||  || — || September 27, 2000 || Socorro || LINEAR || EUN || align=right | 3.5 km || 
|-id=497 bgcolor=#fefefe
| 62497 ||  || — || September 28, 2000 || Socorro || LINEAR || — || align=right | 3.9 km || 
|-id=498 bgcolor=#E9E9E9
| 62498 ||  || — || September 28, 2000 || Socorro || LINEAR || — || align=right | 6.0 km || 
|-id=499 bgcolor=#fefefe
| 62499 ||  || — || September 28, 2000 || Socorro || LINEAR || V || align=right | 1.3 km || 
|-id=500 bgcolor=#E9E9E9
| 62500 ||  || — || September 28, 2000 || Socorro || LINEAR || — || align=right | 3.3 km || 
|}

62501–62600 

|-bgcolor=#E9E9E9
| 62501 ||  || — || September 28, 2000 || Socorro || LINEAR || HEN || align=right | 2.7 km || 
|-id=502 bgcolor=#d6d6d6
| 62502 ||  || — || September 28, 2000 || Socorro || LINEAR || — || align=right | 5.0 km || 
|-id=503 bgcolor=#E9E9E9
| 62503 Tomcave ||  ||  || September 30, 2000 || Anza || M. Collins, M. White || — || align=right | 5.5 km || 
|-id=504 bgcolor=#d6d6d6
| 62504 ||  || — || September 21, 2000 || Socorro || LINEAR || — || align=right | 8.0 km || 
|-id=505 bgcolor=#E9E9E9
| 62505 ||  || — || September 21, 2000 || Socorro || LINEAR || — || align=right | 5.9 km || 
|-id=506 bgcolor=#d6d6d6
| 62506 ||  || — || September 21, 2000 || Socorro || LINEAR || — || align=right | 5.5 km || 
|-id=507 bgcolor=#d6d6d6
| 62507 ||  || — || September 24, 2000 || Socorro || LINEAR || — || align=right | 4.6 km || 
|-id=508 bgcolor=#d6d6d6
| 62508 ||  || — || September 24, 2000 || Socorro || LINEAR || — || align=right | 4.4 km || 
|-id=509 bgcolor=#E9E9E9
| 62509 ||  || — || September 24, 2000 || Socorro || LINEAR || — || align=right | 2.2 km || 
|-id=510 bgcolor=#d6d6d6
| 62510 ||  || — || September 25, 2000 || Socorro || LINEAR || — || align=right | 5.8 km || 
|-id=511 bgcolor=#E9E9E9
| 62511 ||  || — || September 28, 2000 || Socorro || LINEAR || — || align=right | 1.6 km || 
|-id=512 bgcolor=#d6d6d6
| 62512 ||  || — || September 23, 2000 || Socorro || LINEAR || VER || align=right | 5.9 km || 
|-id=513 bgcolor=#fefefe
| 62513 ||  || — || September 24, 2000 || Socorro || LINEAR || — || align=right | 2.2 km || 
|-id=514 bgcolor=#fefefe
| 62514 ||  || — || September 24, 2000 || Socorro || LINEAR || V || align=right | 1.4 km || 
|-id=515 bgcolor=#E9E9E9
| 62515 ||  || — || September 24, 2000 || Socorro || LINEAR || — || align=right | 2.4 km || 
|-id=516 bgcolor=#E9E9E9
| 62516 ||  || — || September 24, 2000 || Socorro || LINEAR || AGN || align=right | 2.6 km || 
|-id=517 bgcolor=#E9E9E9
| 62517 ||  || — || September 24, 2000 || Socorro || LINEAR || — || align=right | 4.4 km || 
|-id=518 bgcolor=#E9E9E9
| 62518 ||  || — || September 24, 2000 || Socorro || LINEAR || GEF || align=right | 3.5 km || 
|-id=519 bgcolor=#fefefe
| 62519 ||  || — || September 24, 2000 || Socorro || LINEAR || NYS || align=right | 1.4 km || 
|-id=520 bgcolor=#E9E9E9
| 62520 ||  || — || September 24, 2000 || Socorro || LINEAR || HEN || align=right | 2.1 km || 
|-id=521 bgcolor=#fefefe
| 62521 ||  || — || September 24, 2000 || Socorro || LINEAR || — || align=right | 1.7 km || 
|-id=522 bgcolor=#E9E9E9
| 62522 ||  || — || September 24, 2000 || Socorro || LINEAR || — || align=right | 2.1 km || 
|-id=523 bgcolor=#E9E9E9
| 62523 ||  || — || September 24, 2000 || Socorro || LINEAR || — || align=right | 3.2 km || 
|-id=524 bgcolor=#d6d6d6
| 62524 ||  || — || September 24, 2000 || Socorro || LINEAR || EOS || align=right | 4.3 km || 
|-id=525 bgcolor=#E9E9E9
| 62525 ||  || — || September 24, 2000 || Socorro || LINEAR || — || align=right | 4.8 km || 
|-id=526 bgcolor=#d6d6d6
| 62526 ||  || — || September 24, 2000 || Socorro || LINEAR || EOS || align=right | 4.7 km || 
|-id=527 bgcolor=#E9E9E9
| 62527 ||  || — || September 24, 2000 || Socorro || LINEAR || HOF || align=right | 5.6 km || 
|-id=528 bgcolor=#d6d6d6
| 62528 ||  || — || September 24, 2000 || Socorro || LINEAR || — || align=right | 3.6 km || 
|-id=529 bgcolor=#fefefe
| 62529 ||  || — || September 24, 2000 || Socorro || LINEAR || — || align=right | 3.4 km || 
|-id=530 bgcolor=#E9E9E9
| 62530 ||  || — || September 24, 2000 || Socorro || LINEAR || — || align=right | 3.7 km || 
|-id=531 bgcolor=#E9E9E9
| 62531 ||  || — || September 24, 2000 || Socorro || LINEAR || — || align=right | 2.3 km || 
|-id=532 bgcolor=#E9E9E9
| 62532 ||  || — || September 24, 2000 || Socorro || LINEAR || — || align=right | 5.8 km || 
|-id=533 bgcolor=#E9E9E9
| 62533 ||  || — || September 24, 2000 || Socorro || LINEAR || — || align=right | 1.7 km || 
|-id=534 bgcolor=#d6d6d6
| 62534 ||  || — || September 24, 2000 || Socorro || LINEAR || KOR || align=right | 3.4 km || 
|-id=535 bgcolor=#d6d6d6
| 62535 ||  || — || September 24, 2000 || Socorro || LINEAR || EOS || align=right | 5.2 km || 
|-id=536 bgcolor=#d6d6d6
| 62536 ||  || — || September 24, 2000 || Socorro || LINEAR || — || align=right | 4.6 km || 
|-id=537 bgcolor=#E9E9E9
| 62537 ||  || — || September 24, 2000 || Socorro || LINEAR || AGN || align=right | 2.9 km || 
|-id=538 bgcolor=#d6d6d6
| 62538 ||  || — || September 24, 2000 || Socorro || LINEAR || CHA || align=right | 4.3 km || 
|-id=539 bgcolor=#d6d6d6
| 62539 ||  || — || September 24, 2000 || Socorro || LINEAR || EOS || align=right | 5.2 km || 
|-id=540 bgcolor=#d6d6d6
| 62540 ||  || — || September 24, 2000 || Socorro || LINEAR || URS || align=right | 4.8 km || 
|-id=541 bgcolor=#E9E9E9
| 62541 ||  || — || September 24, 2000 || Socorro || LINEAR || EUN || align=right | 4.0 km || 
|-id=542 bgcolor=#E9E9E9
| 62542 ||  || — || September 24, 2000 || Socorro || LINEAR || — || align=right | 3.2 km || 
|-id=543 bgcolor=#E9E9E9
| 62543 ||  || — || September 24, 2000 || Socorro || LINEAR || — || align=right | 4.8 km || 
|-id=544 bgcolor=#d6d6d6
| 62544 ||  || — || September 24, 2000 || Socorro || LINEAR || EOS || align=right | 5.3 km || 
|-id=545 bgcolor=#E9E9E9
| 62545 ||  || — || September 24, 2000 || Socorro || LINEAR || — || align=right | 2.5 km || 
|-id=546 bgcolor=#fefefe
| 62546 ||  || — || September 24, 2000 || Socorro || LINEAR || V || align=right | 1.4 km || 
|-id=547 bgcolor=#E9E9E9
| 62547 ||  || — || September 24, 2000 || Socorro || LINEAR || — || align=right | 4.8 km || 
|-id=548 bgcolor=#fefefe
| 62548 ||  || — || September 25, 2000 || Socorro || LINEAR || MAS || align=right | 1.1 km || 
|-id=549 bgcolor=#E9E9E9
| 62549 ||  || — || September 25, 2000 || Socorro || LINEAR || KAZ || align=right | 2.4 km || 
|-id=550 bgcolor=#E9E9E9
| 62550 ||  || — || September 26, 2000 || Socorro || LINEAR || — || align=right | 5.1 km || 
|-id=551 bgcolor=#d6d6d6
| 62551 ||  || — || September 26, 2000 || Socorro || LINEAR || MEL || align=right | 8.2 km || 
|-id=552 bgcolor=#d6d6d6
| 62552 ||  || — || September 26, 2000 || Socorro || LINEAR || KOR || align=right | 3.1 km || 
|-id=553 bgcolor=#fefefe
| 62553 ||  || — || September 26, 2000 || Socorro || LINEAR || NYS || align=right | 1.7 km || 
|-id=554 bgcolor=#d6d6d6
| 62554 ||  || — || September 26, 2000 || Socorro || LINEAR || — || align=right | 5.1 km || 
|-id=555 bgcolor=#E9E9E9
| 62555 ||  || — || September 26, 2000 || Socorro || LINEAR || — || align=right | 3.4 km || 
|-id=556 bgcolor=#E9E9E9
| 62556 ||  || — || September 26, 2000 || Socorro || LINEAR || — || align=right | 2.9 km || 
|-id=557 bgcolor=#E9E9E9
| 62557 ||  || — || September 27, 2000 || Socorro || LINEAR || PAD || align=right | 3.0 km || 
|-id=558 bgcolor=#fefefe
| 62558 ||  || — || September 27, 2000 || Socorro || LINEAR || — || align=right | 1.4 km || 
|-id=559 bgcolor=#fefefe
| 62559 ||  || — || September 27, 2000 || Socorro || LINEAR || MAS || align=right | 1.9 km || 
|-id=560 bgcolor=#E9E9E9
| 62560 ||  || — || September 27, 2000 || Socorro || LINEAR || — || align=right | 6.0 km || 
|-id=561 bgcolor=#fefefe
| 62561 ||  || — || September 27, 2000 || Socorro || LINEAR || NYS || align=right | 5.5 km || 
|-id=562 bgcolor=#E9E9E9
| 62562 ||  || — || September 27, 2000 || Socorro || LINEAR || — || align=right | 2.3 km || 
|-id=563 bgcolor=#E9E9E9
| 62563 ||  || — || September 27, 2000 || Socorro || LINEAR || — || align=right | 4.4 km || 
|-id=564 bgcolor=#E9E9E9
| 62564 ||  || — || September 27, 2000 || Socorro || LINEAR || — || align=right | 2.2 km || 
|-id=565 bgcolor=#E9E9E9
| 62565 ||  || — || September 28, 2000 || Socorro || LINEAR || — || align=right | 5.5 km || 
|-id=566 bgcolor=#d6d6d6
| 62566 ||  || — || September 28, 2000 || Socorro || LINEAR || — || align=right | 3.4 km || 
|-id=567 bgcolor=#E9E9E9
| 62567 ||  || — || September 28, 2000 || Socorro || LINEAR || MAR || align=right | 2.3 km || 
|-id=568 bgcolor=#E9E9E9
| 62568 ||  || — || September 28, 2000 || Socorro || LINEAR || — || align=right | 2.7 km || 
|-id=569 bgcolor=#E9E9E9
| 62569 ||  || — || September 28, 2000 || Socorro || LINEAR || PAD || align=right | 5.2 km || 
|-id=570 bgcolor=#E9E9E9
| 62570 ||  || — || September 28, 2000 || Socorro || LINEAR || — || align=right | 3.1 km || 
|-id=571 bgcolor=#E9E9E9
| 62571 ||  || — || September 28, 2000 || Socorro || LINEAR || — || align=right | 6.4 km || 
|-id=572 bgcolor=#fefefe
| 62572 ||  || — || September 28, 2000 || Socorro || LINEAR || — || align=right | 1.6 km || 
|-id=573 bgcolor=#d6d6d6
| 62573 ||  || — || September 30, 2000 || Socorro || LINEAR || — || align=right | 7.6 km || 
|-id=574 bgcolor=#E9E9E9
| 62574 ||  || — || September 30, 2000 || Socorro || LINEAR || — || align=right | 3.3 km || 
|-id=575 bgcolor=#E9E9E9
| 62575 ||  || — || September 30, 2000 || Socorro || LINEAR || EUN || align=right | 4.4 km || 
|-id=576 bgcolor=#d6d6d6
| 62576 ||  || — || September 30, 2000 || Socorro || LINEAR || — || align=right | 4.5 km || 
|-id=577 bgcolor=#E9E9E9
| 62577 ||  || — || September 25, 2000 || Socorro || LINEAR || — || align=right | 3.1 km || 
|-id=578 bgcolor=#E9E9E9
| 62578 ||  || — || September 27, 2000 || Socorro || LINEAR || — || align=right | 2.9 km || 
|-id=579 bgcolor=#E9E9E9
| 62579 ||  || — || September 23, 2000 || Socorro || LINEAR || EUN || align=right | 3.2 km || 
|-id=580 bgcolor=#d6d6d6
| 62580 ||  || — || September 23, 2000 || Socorro || LINEAR || EOS || align=right | 4.6 km || 
|-id=581 bgcolor=#E9E9E9
| 62581 ||  || — || September 23, 2000 || Socorro || LINEAR || GEF || align=right | 2.5 km || 
|-id=582 bgcolor=#E9E9E9
| 62582 ||  || — || September 27, 2000 || Socorro || LINEAR || — || align=right | 5.7 km || 
|-id=583 bgcolor=#d6d6d6
| 62583 ||  || — || September 27, 2000 || Socorro || LINEAR || — || align=right | 7.5 km || 
|-id=584 bgcolor=#d6d6d6
| 62584 ||  || — || September 27, 2000 || Socorro || LINEAR || ALA || align=right | 8.9 km || 
|-id=585 bgcolor=#d6d6d6
| 62585 ||  || — || September 27, 2000 || Socorro || LINEAR || — || align=right | 9.6 km || 
|-id=586 bgcolor=#d6d6d6
| 62586 ||  || — || September 28, 2000 || Socorro || LINEAR || — || align=right | 7.0 km || 
|-id=587 bgcolor=#d6d6d6
| 62587 ||  || — || September 28, 2000 || Socorro || LINEAR || VER || align=right | 6.9 km || 
|-id=588 bgcolor=#d6d6d6
| 62588 ||  || — || September 28, 2000 || Socorro || LINEAR || HYG || align=right | 6.3 km || 
|-id=589 bgcolor=#d6d6d6
| 62589 ||  || — || September 28, 2000 || Socorro || LINEAR || — || align=right | 4.6 km || 
|-id=590 bgcolor=#d6d6d6
| 62590 ||  || — || September 28, 2000 || Socorro || LINEAR || — || align=right | 5.9 km || 
|-id=591 bgcolor=#E9E9E9
| 62591 ||  || — || September 28, 2000 || Socorro || LINEAR || — || align=right | 2.7 km || 
|-id=592 bgcolor=#E9E9E9
| 62592 ||  || — || September 30, 2000 || Socorro || LINEAR || EUN || align=right | 2.8 km || 
|-id=593 bgcolor=#d6d6d6
| 62593 ||  || — || September 30, 2000 || Socorro || LINEAR || — || align=right | 8.2 km || 
|-id=594 bgcolor=#d6d6d6
| 62594 ||  || — || September 30, 2000 || Socorro || LINEAR || — || align=right | 4.6 km || 
|-id=595 bgcolor=#E9E9E9
| 62595 ||  || — || September 30, 2000 || Socorro || LINEAR || — || align=right | 4.1 km || 
|-id=596 bgcolor=#E9E9E9
| 62596 ||  || — || September 30, 2000 || Socorro || LINEAR || MAR || align=right | 3.7 km || 
|-id=597 bgcolor=#d6d6d6
| 62597 ||  || — || September 26, 2000 || Socorro || LINEAR || — || align=right | 6.3 km || 
|-id=598 bgcolor=#E9E9E9
| 62598 ||  || — || September 27, 2000 || Socorro || LINEAR || — || align=right | 4.0 km || 
|-id=599 bgcolor=#fefefe
| 62599 ||  || — || September 30, 2000 || Socorro || LINEAR || — || align=right | 2.2 km || 
|-id=600 bgcolor=#E9E9E9
| 62600 ||  || — || September 29, 2000 || Haleakala || NEAT || MAR || align=right | 2.3 km || 
|}

62601–62700 

|-bgcolor=#E9E9E9
| 62601 ||  || — || September 29, 2000 || Haleakala || NEAT || MAR || align=right | 2.7 km || 
|-id=602 bgcolor=#fefefe
| 62602 ||  || — || September 29, 2000 || Haleakala || NEAT || — || align=right | 2.4 km || 
|-id=603 bgcolor=#E9E9E9
| 62603 ||  || — || September 28, 2000 || Kitt Peak || Spacewatch || — || align=right | 4.5 km || 
|-id=604 bgcolor=#d6d6d6
| 62604 ||  || — || September 30, 2000 || Socorro || LINEAR || VER || align=right | 9.4 km || 
|-id=605 bgcolor=#d6d6d6
| 62605 ||  || — || September 30, 2000 || Socorro || LINEAR || EOS || align=right | 5.9 km || 
|-id=606 bgcolor=#d6d6d6
| 62606 ||  || — || September 29, 2000 || Kitt Peak || Spacewatch || — || align=right | 6.5 km || 
|-id=607 bgcolor=#d6d6d6
| 62607 ||  || — || September 27, 2000 || Kitt Peak || Spacewatch || — || align=right | 6.6 km || 
|-id=608 bgcolor=#d6d6d6
| 62608 ||  || — || September 23, 2000 || Mauna Kea || B. Gladman || THM || align=right | 6.8 km || 
|-id=609 bgcolor=#E9E9E9
| 62609 ||  || — || September 26, 2000 || Kitt Peak || Spacewatch || HOF || align=right | 6.1 km || 
|-id=610 bgcolor=#d6d6d6
| 62610 ||  || — || September 26, 2000 || Haleakala || NEAT || — || align=right | 5.6 km || 
|-id=611 bgcolor=#d6d6d6
| 62611 ||  || — || September 26, 2000 || Haleakala || NEAT || — || align=right | 3.6 km || 
|-id=612 bgcolor=#d6d6d6
| 62612 ||  || — || September 26, 2000 || Haleakala || NEAT || EOS || align=right | 7.7 km || 
|-id=613 bgcolor=#d6d6d6
| 62613 ||  || — || September 26, 2000 || Haleakala || NEAT || EOS || align=right | 4.6 km || 
|-id=614 bgcolor=#E9E9E9
| 62614 ||  || — || September 25, 2000 || Kitt Peak || Spacewatch || — || align=right | 2.3 km || 
|-id=615 bgcolor=#E9E9E9
| 62615 ||  || — || September 25, 2000 || Haleakala || NEAT || — || align=right | 3.5 km || 
|-id=616 bgcolor=#d6d6d6
| 62616 ||  || — || September 24, 2000 || Socorro || LINEAR || KOR || align=right | 3.2 km || 
|-id=617 bgcolor=#E9E9E9
| 62617 ||  || — || September 20, 2000 || Socorro || LINEAR || MAR || align=right | 3.0 km || 
|-id=618 bgcolor=#d6d6d6
| 62618 ||  || — || September 20, 2000 || Socorro || LINEAR || — || align=right | 7.2 km || 
|-id=619 bgcolor=#E9E9E9
| 62619 ||  || — || September 20, 2000 || Socorro || LINEAR || EUN || align=right | 4.1 km || 
|-id=620 bgcolor=#d6d6d6
| 62620 ||  || — || September 29, 2000 || Anderson Mesa || LONEOS || URS || align=right | 7.7 km || 
|-id=621 bgcolor=#d6d6d6
| 62621 ||  || — || September 29, 2000 || Anderson Mesa || LONEOS || — || align=right | 4.0 km || 
|-id=622 bgcolor=#E9E9E9
| 62622 ||  || — || September 29, 2000 || Anderson Mesa || LONEOS || — || align=right | 4.0 km || 
|-id=623 bgcolor=#E9E9E9
| 62623 ||  || — || September 29, 2000 || Anderson Mesa || LONEOS || ADE || align=right | 6.8 km || 
|-id=624 bgcolor=#E9E9E9
| 62624 ||  || — || September 29, 2000 || Anderson Mesa || LONEOS || — || align=right | 3.5 km || 
|-id=625 bgcolor=#E9E9E9
| 62625 ||  || — || September 29, 2000 || Anderson Mesa || LONEOS || EUN || align=right | 3.0 km || 
|-id=626 bgcolor=#E9E9E9
| 62626 ||  || — || September 29, 2000 || Anderson Mesa || LONEOS || ADE || align=right | 5.7 km || 
|-id=627 bgcolor=#E9E9E9
| 62627 ||  || — || September 30, 2000 || Anderson Mesa || LONEOS || — || align=right | 3.0 km || 
|-id=628 bgcolor=#E9E9E9
| 62628 ||  || — || September 30, 2000 || Anderson Mesa || LONEOS || — || align=right | 6.0 km || 
|-id=629 bgcolor=#d6d6d6
| 62629 ||  || — || September 29, 2000 || Anderson Mesa || LONEOS || — || align=right | 9.2 km || 
|-id=630 bgcolor=#d6d6d6
| 62630 ||  || — || September 29, 2000 || Anderson Mesa || LONEOS || EOS || align=right | 4.6 km || 
|-id=631 bgcolor=#E9E9E9
| 62631 ||  || — || September 29, 2000 || Anderson Mesa || LONEOS || — || align=right | 4.9 km || 
|-id=632 bgcolor=#E9E9E9
| 62632 ||  || — || September 29, 2000 || Anderson Mesa || LONEOS || — || align=right | 6.0 km || 
|-id=633 bgcolor=#d6d6d6
| 62633 ||  || — || September 29, 2000 || Anderson Mesa || LONEOS || URS || align=right | 8.1 km || 
|-id=634 bgcolor=#E9E9E9
| 62634 ||  || — || September 29, 2000 || Anderson Mesa || LONEOS || — || align=right | 5.0 km || 
|-id=635 bgcolor=#d6d6d6
| 62635 ||  || — || September 29, 2000 || Anderson Mesa || LONEOS || — || align=right | 4.9 km || 
|-id=636 bgcolor=#fefefe
| 62636 ||  || — || September 28, 2000 || Anderson Mesa || LONEOS || V || align=right | 1.6 km || 
|-id=637 bgcolor=#fefefe
| 62637 ||  || — || September 28, 2000 || Anderson Mesa || LONEOS || FLO || align=right | 1.9 km || 
|-id=638 bgcolor=#E9E9E9
| 62638 ||  || — || September 28, 2000 || Anderson Mesa || LONEOS || — || align=right | 3.9 km || 
|-id=639 bgcolor=#E9E9E9
| 62639 ||  || — || September 28, 2000 || Anderson Mesa || LONEOS || — || align=right | 3.5 km || 
|-id=640 bgcolor=#d6d6d6
| 62640 ||  || — || September 24, 2000 || Haleakala || NEAT || — || align=right | 7.0 km || 
|-id=641 bgcolor=#d6d6d6
| 62641 ||  || — || September 25, 2000 || Haleakala || NEAT || — || align=right | 4.1 km || 
|-id=642 bgcolor=#d6d6d6
| 62642 ||  || — || September 26, 2000 || Anderson Mesa || LONEOS || — || align=right | 11 km || 
|-id=643 bgcolor=#d6d6d6
| 62643 ||  || — || September 26, 2000 || Haleakala || NEAT || URS || align=right | 7.2 km || 
|-id=644 bgcolor=#d6d6d6
| 62644 ||  || — || September 26, 2000 || Haleakala || NEAT || — || align=right | 6.4 km || 
|-id=645 bgcolor=#E9E9E9
| 62645 ||  || — || September 22, 2000 || Anderson Mesa || LONEOS || HOF || align=right | 5.6 km || 
|-id=646 bgcolor=#E9E9E9
| 62646 ||  || — || September 23, 2000 || Anderson Mesa || LONEOS || — || align=right | 3.6 km || 
|-id=647 bgcolor=#d6d6d6
| 62647 ||  || — || September 20, 2000 || Haleakala || NEAT || CHA || align=right | 3.6 km || 
|-id=648 bgcolor=#E9E9E9
| 62648 ||  || — || September 19, 2000 || Anderson Mesa || LONEOS || — || align=right | 3.0 km || 
|-id=649 bgcolor=#E9E9E9
| 62649 ||  || — || September 20, 2000 || Socorro || LINEAR || — || align=right | 5.1 km || 
|-id=650 bgcolor=#fefefe
| 62650 ||  || — || September 20, 2000 || Socorro || LINEAR || — || align=right | 3.3 km || 
|-id=651 bgcolor=#d6d6d6
| 62651 ||  || — || September 20, 2000 || Socorro || LINEAR || EOS || align=right | 5.1 km || 
|-id=652 bgcolor=#fefefe
| 62652 ||  || — || September 20, 2000 || Socorro || LINEAR || V || align=right | 2.0 km || 
|-id=653 bgcolor=#E9E9E9
| 62653 ||  || — || September 20, 2000 || Socorro || LINEAR || — || align=right | 6.2 km || 
|-id=654 bgcolor=#fefefe
| 62654 ||  || — || September 21, 2000 || Anderson Mesa || LONEOS || NYS || align=right | 1.5 km || 
|-id=655 bgcolor=#E9E9E9
| 62655 ||  || — || September 21, 2000 || Anderson Mesa || LONEOS || — || align=right | 4.4 km || 
|-id=656 bgcolor=#d6d6d6
| 62656 ||  || — || September 21, 2000 || Anderson Mesa || LONEOS || KOR || align=right | 3.5 km || 
|-id=657 bgcolor=#d6d6d6
| 62657 ||  || — || September 21, 2000 || Anderson Mesa || LONEOS || — || align=right | 6.5 km || 
|-id=658 bgcolor=#d6d6d6
| 62658 ||  || — || September 21, 2000 || Anderson Mesa || LONEOS || VER || align=right | 6.2 km || 
|-id=659 bgcolor=#d6d6d6
| 62659 ||  || — || September 22, 2000 || Anderson Mesa || LONEOS || — || align=right | 4.8 km || 
|-id=660 bgcolor=#fefefe
| 62660 ||  || — || September 22, 2000 || Anderson Mesa || LONEOS || — || align=right | 1.8 km || 
|-id=661 bgcolor=#fefefe
| 62661 ||  || — || September 23, 2000 || Anderson Mesa || LONEOS || — || align=right | 1.6 km || 
|-id=662 bgcolor=#d6d6d6
| 62662 ||  || — || September 23, 2000 || Anderson Mesa || LONEOS || — || align=right | 6.5 km || 
|-id=663 bgcolor=#fefefe
| 62663 ||  || — || September 23, 2000 || Anderson Mesa || LONEOS || — || align=right | 3.0 km || 
|-id=664 bgcolor=#E9E9E9
| 62664 ||  || — || September 23, 2000 || Socorro || LINEAR || — || align=right | 4.7 km || 
|-id=665 bgcolor=#d6d6d6
| 62665 ||  || — || September 28, 2000 || Anderson Mesa || LONEOS || TIR || align=right | 4.4 km || 
|-id=666 bgcolor=#d6d6d6
| 62666 Rainawessen || 2000 TA ||  || October 1, 2000 || Farpoint || G. Hug || — || align=right | 9.5 km || 
|-id=667 bgcolor=#E9E9E9
| 62667 || 2000 TC || — || October 1, 2000 || Desert Beaver || W. K. Y. Yeung || ADE || align=right | 9.4 km || 
|-id=668 bgcolor=#d6d6d6
| 62668 ||  || — || October 1, 2000 || Socorro || LINEAR || VER || align=right | 5.2 km || 
|-id=669 bgcolor=#d6d6d6
| 62669 ||  || — || October 1, 2000 || Socorro || LINEAR || KOR || align=right | 3.2 km || 
|-id=670 bgcolor=#E9E9E9
| 62670 ||  || — || October 1, 2000 || Socorro || LINEAR || MRX || align=right | 1.8 km || 
|-id=671 bgcolor=#d6d6d6
| 62671 ||  || — || October 1, 2000 || Socorro || LINEAR || — || align=right | 5.6 km || 
|-id=672 bgcolor=#d6d6d6
| 62672 ||  || — || October 1, 2000 || Socorro || LINEAR || EOS || align=right | 4.9 km || 
|-id=673 bgcolor=#d6d6d6
| 62673 ||  || — || October 1, 2000 || Socorro || LINEAR || KOR || align=right | 2.6 km || 
|-id=674 bgcolor=#d6d6d6
| 62674 ||  || — || October 1, 2000 || Socorro || LINEAR || KOR || align=right | 2.8 km || 
|-id=675 bgcolor=#d6d6d6
| 62675 ||  || — || October 1, 2000 || Socorro || LINEAR || — || align=right | 3.8 km || 
|-id=676 bgcolor=#d6d6d6
| 62676 ||  || — || October 1, 2000 || Socorro || LINEAR || 629 || align=right | 3.2 km || 
|-id=677 bgcolor=#d6d6d6
| 62677 ||  || — || October 1, 2000 || Socorro || LINEAR || — || align=right | 6.0 km || 
|-id=678 bgcolor=#d6d6d6
| 62678 ||  || — || October 1, 2000 || Socorro || LINEAR || — || align=right | 4.4 km || 
|-id=679 bgcolor=#d6d6d6
| 62679 ||  || — || October 1, 2000 || Socorro || LINEAR || — || align=right | 6.0 km || 
|-id=680 bgcolor=#d6d6d6
| 62680 ||  || — || October 1, 2000 || Socorro || LINEAR || — || align=right | 7.4 km || 
|-id=681 bgcolor=#d6d6d6
| 62681 ||  || — || October 1, 2000 || Socorro || LINEAR || KOR || align=right | 3.2 km || 
|-id=682 bgcolor=#E9E9E9
| 62682 ||  || — || October 1, 2000 || Socorro || LINEAR || HOF || align=right | 4.4 km || 
|-id=683 bgcolor=#E9E9E9
| 62683 ||  || — || October 1, 2000 || Socorro || LINEAR || — || align=right | 3.0 km || 
|-id=684 bgcolor=#d6d6d6
| 62684 ||  || — || October 1, 2000 || Socorro || LINEAR || — || align=right | 6.8 km || 
|-id=685 bgcolor=#fefefe
| 62685 ||  || — || October 1, 2000 || Socorro || LINEAR || — || align=right | 2.3 km || 
|-id=686 bgcolor=#E9E9E9
| 62686 ||  || — || October 1, 2000 || Socorro || LINEAR || — || align=right | 9.9 km || 
|-id=687 bgcolor=#d6d6d6
| 62687 ||  || — || October 1, 2000 || Socorro || LINEAR || EOS || align=right | 6.0 km || 
|-id=688 bgcolor=#d6d6d6
| 62688 ||  || — || October 1, 2000 || Socorro || LINEAR || — || align=right | 6.0 km || 
|-id=689 bgcolor=#d6d6d6
| 62689 ||  || — || October 1, 2000 || Socorro || LINEAR || EOS || align=right | 3.9 km || 
|-id=690 bgcolor=#d6d6d6
| 62690 ||  || — || October 1, 2000 || Socorro || LINEAR || — || align=right | 4.2 km || 
|-id=691 bgcolor=#E9E9E9
| 62691 ||  || — || October 2, 2000 || Socorro || LINEAR || VIB || align=right | 6.5 km || 
|-id=692 bgcolor=#C2FFFF
| 62692 ||  || — || October 2, 2000 || Socorro || LINEAR || L5 || align=right | 16 km || 
|-id=693 bgcolor=#E9E9E9
| 62693 ||  || — || October 2, 2000 || Socorro || LINEAR || — || align=right | 2.9 km || 
|-id=694 bgcolor=#E9E9E9
| 62694 ||  || — || October 2, 2000 || Socorro || LINEAR || HNS || align=right | 3.4 km || 
|-id=695 bgcolor=#d6d6d6
| 62695 ||  || — || October 2, 2000 || Socorro || LINEAR || — || align=right | 4.2 km || 
|-id=696 bgcolor=#d6d6d6
| 62696 ||  || — || October 1, 2000 || Socorro || LINEAR || THM || align=right | 6.3 km || 
|-id=697 bgcolor=#d6d6d6
| 62697 ||  || — || October 1, 2000 || Socorro || LINEAR || — || align=right | 3.9 km || 
|-id=698 bgcolor=#d6d6d6
| 62698 ||  || — || October 4, 2000 || Socorro || LINEAR || EOS || align=right | 3.7 km || 
|-id=699 bgcolor=#E9E9E9
| 62699 ||  || — || October 5, 2000 || Haleakala || NEAT || — || align=right | 2.7 km || 
|-id=700 bgcolor=#fefefe
| 62700 ||  || — || October 1, 2000 || Kitt Peak || Spacewatch || NYS || align=right | 1.3 km || 
|}

62701–62800 

|-bgcolor=#d6d6d6
| 62701 Davidrankin ||  ||  || October 7, 2000 || Emerald Lane || L. Ball || — || align=right | 5.6 km || 
|-id=702 bgcolor=#d6d6d6
| 62702 ||  || — || October 1, 2000 || Socorro || LINEAR || EOS || align=right | 4.0 km || 
|-id=703 bgcolor=#d6d6d6
| 62703 ||  || — || October 2, 2000 || Anderson Mesa || LONEOS || — || align=right | 5.8 km || 
|-id=704 bgcolor=#E9E9E9
| 62704 ||  || — || October 6, 2000 || Anderson Mesa || LONEOS || HEN || align=right | 2.2 km || 
|-id=705 bgcolor=#d6d6d6
| 62705 ||  || — || October 1, 2000 || Socorro || LINEAR || — || align=right | 6.3 km || 
|-id=706 bgcolor=#E9E9E9
| 62706 ||  || — || October 1, 2000 || Socorro || LINEAR || EUN || align=right | 3.0 km || 
|-id=707 bgcolor=#fefefe
| 62707 ||  || — || October 1, 2000 || Socorro || LINEAR || V || align=right | 1.9 km || 
|-id=708 bgcolor=#fefefe
| 62708 ||  || — || October 1, 2000 || Socorro || LINEAR || V || align=right | 1.8 km || 
|-id=709 bgcolor=#E9E9E9
| 62709 ||  || — || October 1, 2000 || Socorro || LINEAR || — || align=right | 3.0 km || 
|-id=710 bgcolor=#E9E9E9
| 62710 ||  || — || October 1, 2000 || Socorro || LINEAR || MAR || align=right | 2.2 km || 
|-id=711 bgcolor=#d6d6d6
| 62711 ||  || — || October 1, 2000 || Socorro || LINEAR || — || align=right | 7.4 km || 
|-id=712 bgcolor=#E9E9E9
| 62712 ||  || — || October 1, 2000 || Socorro || LINEAR || — || align=right | 5.1 km || 
|-id=713 bgcolor=#fefefe
| 62713 ||  || — || October 1, 2000 || Socorro || LINEAR || — || align=right | 3.1 km || 
|-id=714 bgcolor=#C2FFFF
| 62714 ||  || — || October 1, 2000 || Socorro || LINEAR || L5 || align=right | 17 km || 
|-id=715 bgcolor=#d6d6d6
| 62715 ||  || — || October 1, 2000 || Socorro || LINEAR || EOS || align=right | 5.9 km || 
|-id=716 bgcolor=#d6d6d6
| 62716 ||  || — || October 1, 2000 || Socorro || LINEAR || — || align=right | 5.6 km || 
|-id=717 bgcolor=#d6d6d6
| 62717 ||  || — || October 1, 2000 || Socorro || LINEAR || — || align=right | 9.0 km || 
|-id=718 bgcolor=#d6d6d6
| 62718 ||  || — || October 1, 2000 || Socorro || LINEAR || EOS || align=right | 4.7 km || 
|-id=719 bgcolor=#E9E9E9
| 62719 ||  || — || October 1, 2000 || Anderson Mesa || LONEOS || HOF || align=right | 7.0 km || 
|-id=720 bgcolor=#fefefe
| 62720 ||  || — || October 1, 2000 || Anderson Mesa || LONEOS || — || align=right | 1.7 km || 
|-id=721 bgcolor=#d6d6d6
| 62721 ||  || — || October 1, 2000 || Socorro || LINEAR || EOS || align=right | 3.9 km || 
|-id=722 bgcolor=#E9E9E9
| 62722 ||  || — || October 1, 2000 || Socorro || LINEAR || GEF || align=right | 3.0 km || 
|-id=723 bgcolor=#E9E9E9
| 62723 ||  || — || October 1, 2000 || Socorro || LINEAR || — || align=right | 3.0 km || 
|-id=724 bgcolor=#d6d6d6
| 62724 ||  || — || October 1, 2000 || Socorro || LINEAR || TEL || align=right | 8.0 km || 
|-id=725 bgcolor=#d6d6d6
| 62725 ||  || — || October 1, 2000 || Socorro || LINEAR || EOS || align=right | 4.5 km || 
|-id=726 bgcolor=#d6d6d6
| 62726 ||  || — || October 1, 2000 || Anderson Mesa || LONEOS || 7:4* || align=right | 14 km || 
|-id=727 bgcolor=#E9E9E9
| 62727 ||  || — || October 1, 2000 || Socorro || LINEAR || — || align=right | 5.2 km || 
|-id=728 bgcolor=#E9E9E9
| 62728 ||  || — || October 2, 2000 || Anderson Mesa || LONEOS || MAR || align=right | 4.3 km || 
|-id=729 bgcolor=#d6d6d6
| 62729 ||  || — || October 2, 2000 || Anderson Mesa || LONEOS || — || align=right | 4.5 km || 
|-id=730 bgcolor=#FA8072
| 62730 ||  || — || October 2, 2000 || Anderson Mesa || LONEOS || — || align=right | 1.8 km || 
|-id=731 bgcolor=#d6d6d6
| 62731 ||  || — || October 2, 2000 || Anderson Mesa || LONEOS || — || align=right | 9.0 km || 
|-id=732 bgcolor=#E9E9E9
| 62732 ||  || — || October 2, 2000 || Anderson Mesa || LONEOS || MAR || align=right | 3.3 km || 
|-id=733 bgcolor=#d6d6d6
| 62733 ||  || — || October 2, 2000 || Anderson Mesa || LONEOS || AEG || align=right | 10 km || 
|-id=734 bgcolor=#E9E9E9
| 62734 ||  || — || October 2, 2000 || Anderson Mesa || LONEOS || — || align=right | 2.9 km || 
|-id=735 bgcolor=#E9E9E9
| 62735 ||  || — || October 2, 2000 || Anderson Mesa || LONEOS || AER || align=right | 5.3 km || 
|-id=736 bgcolor=#fefefe
| 62736 ||  || — || October 2, 2000 || Anderson Mesa || LONEOS || — || align=right | 2.6 km || 
|-id=737 bgcolor=#d6d6d6
| 62737 ||  || — || October 2, 2000 || Anderson Mesa || LONEOS || — || align=right | 10 km || 
|-id=738 bgcolor=#d6d6d6
| 62738 ||  || — || October 2, 2000 || Anderson Mesa || LONEOS || — || align=right | 5.4 km || 
|-id=739 bgcolor=#d6d6d6
| 62739 ||  || — || October 2, 2000 || Socorro || LINEAR || — || align=right | 4.6 km || 
|-id=740 bgcolor=#d6d6d6
| 62740 ||  || — || October 1, 2000 || Anderson Mesa || LONEOS || — || align=right | 5.4 km || 
|-id=741 bgcolor=#d6d6d6
| 62741 ||  || — || October 1, 2000 || Socorro || LINEAR || THM || align=right | 6.8 km || 
|-id=742 bgcolor=#E9E9E9
| 62742 ||  || — || October 6, 2000 || Anderson Mesa || LONEOS || — || align=right | 1.9 km || 
|-id=743 bgcolor=#E9E9E9
| 62743 ||  || — || October 21, 2000 || Višnjan Observatory || K. Korlević || — || align=right | 4.8 km || 
|-id=744 bgcolor=#d6d6d6
| 62744 ||  || — || October 20, 2000 || Monte Agliale || M. M. M. Santangelo || 7:4 || align=right | 9.8 km || 
|-id=745 bgcolor=#fefefe
| 62745 ||  || — || October 21, 2000 || Višnjan Observatory || K. Korlević || — || align=right | 4.0 km || 
|-id=746 bgcolor=#d6d6d6
| 62746 ||  || — || October 22, 2000 || Višnjan Observatory || K. Korlević || — || align=right | 7.4 km || 
|-id=747 bgcolor=#E9E9E9
| 62747 ||  || — || October 24, 2000 || Črni Vrh || Črni Vrh || — || align=right | 5.1 km || 
|-id=748 bgcolor=#d6d6d6
| 62748 ||  || — || October 24, 2000 || Socorro || LINEAR || — || align=right | 5.0 km || 
|-id=749 bgcolor=#fefefe
| 62749 ||  || — || October 24, 2000 || Socorro || LINEAR || — || align=right | 1.6 km || 
|-id=750 bgcolor=#E9E9E9
| 62750 ||  || — || October 24, 2000 || Socorro || LINEAR || AER || align=right | 5.2 km || 
|-id=751 bgcolor=#fefefe
| 62751 ||  || — || October 24, 2000 || Socorro || LINEAR || MAS || align=right | 1.7 km || 
|-id=752 bgcolor=#E9E9E9
| 62752 ||  || — || October 24, 2000 || Socorro || LINEAR || — || align=right | 2.1 km || 
|-id=753 bgcolor=#d6d6d6
| 62753 ||  || — || October 24, 2000 || Socorro || LINEAR || — || align=right | 5.5 km || 
|-id=754 bgcolor=#E9E9E9
| 62754 ||  || — || October 24, 2000 || Socorro || LINEAR || ADE || align=right | 4.9 km || 
|-id=755 bgcolor=#fefefe
| 62755 ||  || — || October 24, 2000 || Socorro || LINEAR || — || align=right | 2.3 km || 
|-id=756 bgcolor=#d6d6d6
| 62756 ||  || — || October 24, 2000 || Socorro || LINEAR || — || align=right | 5.8 km || 
|-id=757 bgcolor=#fefefe
| 62757 ||  || — || October 24, 2000 || Socorro || LINEAR || V || align=right | 1.6 km || 
|-id=758 bgcolor=#d6d6d6
| 62758 ||  || — || October 24, 2000 || Socorro || LINEAR || — || align=right | 6.4 km || 
|-id=759 bgcolor=#d6d6d6
| 62759 ||  || — || October 24, 2000 || Socorro || LINEAR || — || align=right | 14 km || 
|-id=760 bgcolor=#d6d6d6
| 62760 ||  || — || October 24, 2000 || Socorro || LINEAR || ALA || align=right | 15 km || 
|-id=761 bgcolor=#E9E9E9
| 62761 ||  || — || October 18, 2000 || Socorro || LINEAR || — || align=right | 8.6 km || 
|-id=762 bgcolor=#fefefe
| 62762 ||  || — || October 18, 2000 || Socorro || LINEAR || — || align=right | 3.1 km || 
|-id=763 bgcolor=#E9E9E9
| 62763 ||  || — || October 24, 2000 || Socorro || LINEAR || AGN || align=right | 3.0 km || 
|-id=764 bgcolor=#d6d6d6
| 62764 ||  || — || October 23, 2000 || Višnjan Observatory || K. Korlević || — || align=right | 9.3 km || 
|-id=765 bgcolor=#d6d6d6
| 62765 ||  || — || October 24, 2000 || Socorro || LINEAR || EOS || align=right | 5.3 km || 
|-id=766 bgcolor=#fefefe
| 62766 ||  || — || October 25, 2000 || Socorro || LINEAR || — || align=right | 2.2 km || 
|-id=767 bgcolor=#E9E9E9
| 62767 ||  || — || October 24, 2000 || Socorro || LINEAR || — || align=right | 2.3 km || 
|-id=768 bgcolor=#E9E9E9
| 62768 ||  || — || October 24, 2000 || Socorro || LINEAR || — || align=right | 2.4 km || 
|-id=769 bgcolor=#E9E9E9
| 62769 ||  || — || October 24, 2000 || Socorro || LINEAR || WIT || align=right | 2.2 km || 
|-id=770 bgcolor=#d6d6d6
| 62770 ||  || — || October 24, 2000 || Socorro || LINEAR || HYG || align=right | 7.8 km || 
|-id=771 bgcolor=#d6d6d6
| 62771 ||  || — || October 25, 2000 || Socorro || LINEAR || — || align=right | 7.7 km || 
|-id=772 bgcolor=#d6d6d6
| 62772 ||  || — || October 24, 2000 || Socorro || LINEAR || — || align=right | 5.3 km || 
|-id=773 bgcolor=#fefefe
| 62773 ||  || — || October 24, 2000 || Socorro || LINEAR || NYS || align=right | 1.4 km || 
|-id=774 bgcolor=#d6d6d6
| 62774 ||  || — || October 24, 2000 || Socorro || LINEAR || — || align=right | 3.0 km || 
|-id=775 bgcolor=#E9E9E9
| 62775 ||  || — || October 24, 2000 || Socorro || LINEAR || — || align=right | 4.2 km || 
|-id=776 bgcolor=#d6d6d6
| 62776 ||  || — || October 24, 2000 || Socorro || LINEAR || EOS || align=right | 3.7 km || 
|-id=777 bgcolor=#d6d6d6
| 62777 ||  || — || October 24, 2000 || Socorro || LINEAR || THM || align=right | 6.1 km || 
|-id=778 bgcolor=#d6d6d6
| 62778 ||  || — || October 24, 2000 || Socorro || LINEAR || EOS || align=right | 4.1 km || 
|-id=779 bgcolor=#d6d6d6
| 62779 ||  || — || October 24, 2000 || Socorro || LINEAR || — || align=right | 7.4 km || 
|-id=780 bgcolor=#E9E9E9
| 62780 ||  || — || October 24, 2000 || Socorro || LINEAR || — || align=right | 7.7 km || 
|-id=781 bgcolor=#d6d6d6
| 62781 ||  || — || October 24, 2000 || Socorro || LINEAR || — || align=right | 6.7 km || 
|-id=782 bgcolor=#fefefe
| 62782 ||  || — || October 24, 2000 || Socorro || LINEAR || — || align=right | 1.8 km || 
|-id=783 bgcolor=#d6d6d6
| 62783 ||  || — || October 24, 2000 || Socorro || LINEAR || — || align=right | 6.7 km || 
|-id=784 bgcolor=#d6d6d6
| 62784 ||  || — || October 24, 2000 || Socorro || LINEAR || — || align=right | 9.7 km || 
|-id=785 bgcolor=#fefefe
| 62785 ||  || — || October 24, 2000 || Socorro || LINEAR || — || align=right | 1.6 km || 
|-id=786 bgcolor=#E9E9E9
| 62786 ||  || — || October 24, 2000 || Socorro || LINEAR || RAF || align=right | 2.1 km || 
|-id=787 bgcolor=#E9E9E9
| 62787 ||  || — || October 24, 2000 || Socorro || LINEAR || — || align=right | 2.4 km || 
|-id=788 bgcolor=#E9E9E9
| 62788 ||  || — || October 24, 2000 || Socorro || LINEAR || — || align=right | 2.7 km || 
|-id=789 bgcolor=#d6d6d6
| 62789 ||  || — || October 24, 2000 || Socorro || LINEAR || ALA || align=right | 11 km || 
|-id=790 bgcolor=#fefefe
| 62790 ||  || — || October 24, 2000 || Socorro || LINEAR || — || align=right | 2.5 km || 
|-id=791 bgcolor=#d6d6d6
| 62791 ||  || — || October 24, 2000 || Socorro || LINEAR || — || align=right | 7.9 km || 
|-id=792 bgcolor=#E9E9E9
| 62792 ||  || — || October 30, 2000 || Socorro || LINEAR || EUN || align=right | 2.7 km || 
|-id=793 bgcolor=#fefefe
| 62793 ||  || — || October 29, 2000 || Kitt Peak || Spacewatch || — || align=right | 1.6 km || 
|-id=794 bgcolor=#d6d6d6
| 62794 Scheirich ||  ||  || October 30, 2000 || Ondřejov || P. Pravec, P. Kušnirák || — || align=right | 6.7 km || 
|-id=795 bgcolor=#d6d6d6
| 62795 ||  || — || October 24, 2000 || Socorro || LINEAR || EOS || align=right | 3.8 km || 
|-id=796 bgcolor=#fefefe
| 62796 ||  || — || October 24, 2000 || Socorro || LINEAR || NYS || align=right | 1.6 km || 
|-id=797 bgcolor=#d6d6d6
| 62797 ||  || — || October 24, 2000 || Socorro || LINEAR || — || align=right | 3.1 km || 
|-id=798 bgcolor=#E9E9E9
| 62798 ||  || — || October 24, 2000 || Socorro || LINEAR || AGN || align=right | 3.0 km || 
|-id=799 bgcolor=#fefefe
| 62799 ||  || — || October 24, 2000 || Socorro || LINEAR || NYS || align=right | 1.5 km || 
|-id=800 bgcolor=#d6d6d6
| 62800 ||  || — || October 24, 2000 || Socorro || LINEAR || EOS || align=right | 3.6 km || 
|}

62801–62900 

|-bgcolor=#d6d6d6
| 62801 ||  || — || October 24, 2000 || Socorro || LINEAR || KOR || align=right | 2.9 km || 
|-id=802 bgcolor=#E9E9E9
| 62802 ||  || — || October 24, 2000 || Socorro || LINEAR || — || align=right | 2.9 km || 
|-id=803 bgcolor=#d6d6d6
| 62803 ||  || — || October 24, 2000 || Socorro || LINEAR || KOR || align=right | 4.7 km || 
|-id=804 bgcolor=#d6d6d6
| 62804 ||  || — || October 24, 2000 || Socorro || LINEAR || — || align=right | 8.3 km || 
|-id=805 bgcolor=#E9E9E9
| 62805 ||  || — || October 24, 2000 || Socorro || LINEAR || — || align=right | 5.9 km || 
|-id=806 bgcolor=#d6d6d6
| 62806 ||  || — || October 24, 2000 || Socorro || LINEAR || KOR || align=right | 3.1 km || 
|-id=807 bgcolor=#d6d6d6
| 62807 ||  || — || October 24, 2000 || Socorro || LINEAR || HYG || align=right | 4.8 km || 
|-id=808 bgcolor=#d6d6d6
| 62808 ||  || — || October 24, 2000 || Socorro || LINEAR || KOR || align=right | 3.2 km || 
|-id=809 bgcolor=#fefefe
| 62809 ||  || — || October 24, 2000 || Socorro || LINEAR || — || align=right | 1.3 km || 
|-id=810 bgcolor=#E9E9E9
| 62810 ||  || — || October 24, 2000 || Socorro || LINEAR || — || align=right | 6.1 km || 
|-id=811 bgcolor=#d6d6d6
| 62811 ||  || — || October 24, 2000 || Socorro || LINEAR || KOR || align=right | 3.0 km || 
|-id=812 bgcolor=#E9E9E9
| 62812 ||  || — || October 24, 2000 || Socorro || LINEAR || HEN || align=right | 2.8 km || 
|-id=813 bgcolor=#E9E9E9
| 62813 ||  || — || October 24, 2000 || Socorro || LINEAR || — || align=right | 4.3 km || 
|-id=814 bgcolor=#E9E9E9
| 62814 ||  || — || October 24, 2000 || Socorro || LINEAR || — || align=right | 2.0 km || 
|-id=815 bgcolor=#fefefe
| 62815 ||  || — || October 24, 2000 || Socorro || LINEAR || V || align=right | 2.0 km || 
|-id=816 bgcolor=#d6d6d6
| 62816 ||  || — || October 24, 2000 || Socorro || LINEAR || — || align=right | 5.3 km || 
|-id=817 bgcolor=#d6d6d6
| 62817 ||  || — || October 24, 2000 || Socorro || LINEAR || TEL || align=right | 3.6 km || 
|-id=818 bgcolor=#fefefe
| 62818 ||  || — || October 24, 2000 || Socorro || LINEAR || NYS || align=right | 1.4 km || 
|-id=819 bgcolor=#E9E9E9
| 62819 ||  || — || October 24, 2000 || Socorro || LINEAR || — || align=right | 5.5 km || 
|-id=820 bgcolor=#d6d6d6
| 62820 ||  || — || October 24, 2000 || Socorro || LINEAR || 3:2 || align=right | 9.1 km || 
|-id=821 bgcolor=#E9E9E9
| 62821 ||  || — || October 24, 2000 || Socorro || LINEAR || — || align=right | 2.4 km || 
|-id=822 bgcolor=#d6d6d6
| 62822 ||  || — || October 24, 2000 || Socorro || LINEAR || — || align=right | 3.1 km || 
|-id=823 bgcolor=#d6d6d6
| 62823 ||  || — || October 24, 2000 || Socorro || LINEAR || — || align=right | 9.2 km || 
|-id=824 bgcolor=#E9E9E9
| 62824 ||  || — || October 24, 2000 || Socorro || LINEAR || GEF || align=right | 3.3 km || 
|-id=825 bgcolor=#d6d6d6
| 62825 ||  || — || October 24, 2000 || Socorro || LINEAR || THM || align=right | 6.7 km || 
|-id=826 bgcolor=#E9E9E9
| 62826 ||  || — || October 24, 2000 || Socorro || LINEAR || MAR || align=right | 2.9 km || 
|-id=827 bgcolor=#E9E9E9
| 62827 ||  || — || October 24, 2000 || Socorro || LINEAR || — || align=right | 4.1 km || 
|-id=828 bgcolor=#d6d6d6
| 62828 ||  || — || October 24, 2000 || Socorro || LINEAR || — || align=right | 7.4 km || 
|-id=829 bgcolor=#d6d6d6
| 62829 ||  || — || October 24, 2000 || Socorro || LINEAR || HYG || align=right | 7.2 km || 
|-id=830 bgcolor=#fefefe
| 62830 ||  || — || October 24, 2000 || Socorro || LINEAR || — || align=right | 2.0 km || 
|-id=831 bgcolor=#d6d6d6
| 62831 ||  || — || October 24, 2000 || Socorro || LINEAR || — || align=right | 4.8 km || 
|-id=832 bgcolor=#d6d6d6
| 62832 ||  || — || October 24, 2000 || Socorro || LINEAR || — || align=right | 6.2 km || 
|-id=833 bgcolor=#E9E9E9
| 62833 ||  || — || October 24, 2000 || Socorro || LINEAR || — || align=right | 3.9 km || 
|-id=834 bgcolor=#E9E9E9
| 62834 ||  || — || October 24, 2000 || Socorro || LINEAR || — || align=right | 3.4 km || 
|-id=835 bgcolor=#E9E9E9
| 62835 ||  || — || October 25, 2000 || Socorro || LINEAR || — || align=right | 4.7 km || 
|-id=836 bgcolor=#E9E9E9
| 62836 ||  || — || October 25, 2000 || Socorro || LINEAR || — || align=right | 3.4 km || 
|-id=837 bgcolor=#E9E9E9
| 62837 ||  || — || October 25, 2000 || Socorro || LINEAR || — || align=right | 5.1 km || 
|-id=838 bgcolor=#fefefe
| 62838 ||  || — || October 25, 2000 || Socorro || LINEAR || — || align=right | 1.6 km || 
|-id=839 bgcolor=#d6d6d6
| 62839 ||  || — || October 25, 2000 || Socorro || LINEAR || EOS || align=right | 5.4 km || 
|-id=840 bgcolor=#E9E9E9
| 62840 ||  || — || October 25, 2000 || Socorro || LINEAR || — || align=right | 4.7 km || 
|-id=841 bgcolor=#E9E9E9
| 62841 ||  || — || October 25, 2000 || Socorro || LINEAR || — || align=right | 3.1 km || 
|-id=842 bgcolor=#E9E9E9
| 62842 ||  || — || October 25, 2000 || Socorro || LINEAR || — || align=right | 3.8 km || 
|-id=843 bgcolor=#E9E9E9
| 62843 ||  || — || October 25, 2000 || Socorro || LINEAR || — || align=right | 5.6 km || 
|-id=844 bgcolor=#d6d6d6
| 62844 ||  || — || October 25, 2000 || Socorro || LINEAR || EOS || align=right | 4.1 km || 
|-id=845 bgcolor=#E9E9E9
| 62845 ||  || — || October 25, 2000 || Socorro || LINEAR || — || align=right | 5.1 km || 
|-id=846 bgcolor=#d6d6d6
| 62846 ||  || — || October 25, 2000 || Socorro || LINEAR || HYG || align=right | 8.1 km || 
|-id=847 bgcolor=#fefefe
| 62847 ||  || — || October 25, 2000 || Socorro || LINEAR || V || align=right | 1.3 km || 
|-id=848 bgcolor=#d6d6d6
| 62848 ||  || — || October 25, 2000 || Socorro || LINEAR || EOS || align=right | 9.4 km || 
|-id=849 bgcolor=#E9E9E9
| 62849 ||  || — || October 25, 2000 || Socorro || LINEAR || — || align=right | 3.2 km || 
|-id=850 bgcolor=#fefefe
| 62850 ||  || — || October 25, 2000 || Socorro || LINEAR || — || align=right | 2.5 km || 
|-id=851 bgcolor=#E9E9E9
| 62851 ||  || — || October 25, 2000 || Socorro || LINEAR || — || align=right | 7.7 km || 
|-id=852 bgcolor=#fefefe
| 62852 ||  || — || October 30, 2000 || Socorro || LINEAR || — || align=right | 2.6 km || 
|-id=853 bgcolor=#d6d6d6
| 62853 ||  || — || October 27, 2000 || Desert Beaver || W. K. Y. Yeung || slow || align=right | 7.2 km || 
|-id=854 bgcolor=#d6d6d6
| 62854 ||  || — || October 24, 2000 || Socorro || LINEAR || THM || align=right | 5.7 km || 
|-id=855 bgcolor=#E9E9E9
| 62855 ||  || — || October 24, 2000 || Socorro || LINEAR || — || align=right | 4.3 km || 
|-id=856 bgcolor=#fefefe
| 62856 ||  || — || October 24, 2000 || Socorro || LINEAR || — || align=right | 1.8 km || 
|-id=857 bgcolor=#E9E9E9
| 62857 ||  || — || October 24, 2000 || Socorro || LINEAR || — || align=right | 2.0 km || 
|-id=858 bgcolor=#d6d6d6
| 62858 ||  || — || October 24, 2000 || Socorro || LINEAR || — || align=right | 8.0 km || 
|-id=859 bgcolor=#d6d6d6
| 62859 ||  || — || October 24, 2000 || Socorro || LINEAR || HYG || align=right | 7.9 km || 
|-id=860 bgcolor=#d6d6d6
| 62860 ||  || — || October 24, 2000 || Socorro || LINEAR || EOS || align=right | 5.0 km || 
|-id=861 bgcolor=#E9E9E9
| 62861 ||  || — || October 24, 2000 || Socorro || LINEAR || — || align=right | 3.9 km || 
|-id=862 bgcolor=#d6d6d6
| 62862 ||  || — || October 24, 2000 || Socorro || LINEAR || HYG || align=right | 7.0 km || 
|-id=863 bgcolor=#E9E9E9
| 62863 ||  || — || October 24, 2000 || Socorro || LINEAR || — || align=right | 2.4 km || 
|-id=864 bgcolor=#E9E9E9
| 62864 ||  || — || October 25, 2000 || Socorro || LINEAR || — || align=right | 2.5 km || 
|-id=865 bgcolor=#E9E9E9
| 62865 ||  || — || October 27, 2000 || Socorro || LINEAR || EUN || align=right | 2.8 km || 
|-id=866 bgcolor=#d6d6d6
| 62866 ||  || — || October 30, 2000 || Socorro || LINEAR || — || align=right | 7.3 km || 
|-id=867 bgcolor=#E9E9E9
| 62867 ||  || — || October 30, 2000 || Socorro || LINEAR || HOF || align=right | 5.1 km || 
|-id=868 bgcolor=#E9E9E9
| 62868 ||  || — || October 31, 2000 || Socorro || LINEAR || HOF || align=right | 7.4 km || 
|-id=869 bgcolor=#d6d6d6
| 62869 ||  || — || October 31, 2000 || Socorro || LINEAR || — || align=right | 8.4 km || 
|-id=870 bgcolor=#d6d6d6
| 62870 ||  || — || October 31, 2000 || Socorro || LINEAR || — || align=right | 4.9 km || 
|-id=871 bgcolor=#d6d6d6
| 62871 ||  || — || October 31, 2000 || Socorro || LINEAR || — || align=right | 3.3 km || 
|-id=872 bgcolor=#fefefe
| 62872 ||  || — || October 31, 2000 || Socorro || LINEAR || — || align=right | 2.2 km || 
|-id=873 bgcolor=#E9E9E9
| 62873 ||  || — || October 31, 2000 || Socorro || LINEAR || — || align=right | 3.3 km || 
|-id=874 bgcolor=#E9E9E9
| 62874 ||  || — || October 31, 2000 || Socorro || LINEAR || — || align=right | 5.6 km || 
|-id=875 bgcolor=#d6d6d6
| 62875 ||  || — || October 31, 2000 || Socorro || LINEAR || — || align=right | 6.2 km || 
|-id=876 bgcolor=#d6d6d6
| 62876 ||  || — || October 24, 2000 || Socorro || LINEAR || — || align=right | 3.6 km || 
|-id=877 bgcolor=#d6d6d6
| 62877 ||  || — || October 24, 2000 || Socorro || LINEAR || — || align=right | 12 km || 
|-id=878 bgcolor=#E9E9E9
| 62878 ||  || — || October 25, 2000 || Socorro || LINEAR || — || align=right | 5.4 km || 
|-id=879 bgcolor=#E9E9E9
| 62879 ||  || — || October 25, 2000 || Socorro || LINEAR || — || align=right | 3.6 km || 
|-id=880 bgcolor=#d6d6d6
| 62880 ||  || — || October 25, 2000 || Socorro || LINEAR || — || align=right | 7.4 km || 
|-id=881 bgcolor=#d6d6d6
| 62881 ||  || — || October 25, 2000 || Socorro || LINEAR || — || align=right | 7.2 km || 
|-id=882 bgcolor=#fefefe
| 62882 ||  || — || October 25, 2000 || Socorro || LINEAR || FLO || align=right | 1.3 km || 
|-id=883 bgcolor=#d6d6d6
| 62883 ||  || — || October 25, 2000 || Socorro || LINEAR || — || align=right | 8.1 km || 
|-id=884 bgcolor=#d6d6d6
| 62884 ||  || — || October 25, 2000 || Socorro || LINEAR || EOS || align=right | 4.9 km || 
|-id=885 bgcolor=#fefefe
| 62885 ||  || — || October 25, 2000 || Socorro || LINEAR || FLO || align=right | 2.3 km || 
|-id=886 bgcolor=#d6d6d6
| 62886 ||  || — || October 25, 2000 || Socorro || LINEAR || EOS || align=right | 3.4 km || 
|-id=887 bgcolor=#d6d6d6
| 62887 ||  || — || October 25, 2000 || Socorro || LINEAR || — || align=right | 4.0 km || 
|-id=888 bgcolor=#E9E9E9
| 62888 ||  || — || October 25, 2000 || Socorro || LINEAR || — || align=right | 3.4 km || 
|-id=889 bgcolor=#E9E9E9
| 62889 ||  || — || October 25, 2000 || Socorro || LINEAR || — || align=right | 4.3 km || 
|-id=890 bgcolor=#d6d6d6
| 62890 ||  || — || October 25, 2000 || Socorro || LINEAR || EOS || align=right | 4.8 km || 
|-id=891 bgcolor=#fefefe
| 62891 ||  || — || October 25, 2000 || Socorro || LINEAR || FLO || align=right | 1.8 km || 
|-id=892 bgcolor=#E9E9E9
| 62892 ||  || — || October 25, 2000 || Socorro || LINEAR || — || align=right | 4.0 km || 
|-id=893 bgcolor=#fefefe
| 62893 ||  || — || October 25, 2000 || Socorro || LINEAR || V || align=right | 1.5 km || 
|-id=894 bgcolor=#d6d6d6
| 62894 ||  || — || October 25, 2000 || Socorro || LINEAR || — || align=right | 6.4 km || 
|-id=895 bgcolor=#E9E9E9
| 62895 ||  || — || October 25, 2000 || Socorro || LINEAR || — || align=right | 2.2 km || 
|-id=896 bgcolor=#E9E9E9
| 62896 ||  || — || October 25, 2000 || Socorro || LINEAR || — || align=right | 2.8 km || 
|-id=897 bgcolor=#E9E9E9
| 62897 ||  || — || October 25, 2000 || Socorro || LINEAR || — || align=right | 3.8 km || 
|-id=898 bgcolor=#fefefe
| 62898 ||  || — || October 25, 2000 || Socorro || LINEAR || — || align=right | 2.2 km || 
|-id=899 bgcolor=#E9E9E9
| 62899 ||  || — || October 25, 2000 || Socorro || LINEAR || — || align=right | 4.1 km || 
|-id=900 bgcolor=#d6d6d6
| 62900 ||  || — || October 29, 2000 || Socorro || LINEAR || EOS || align=right | 5.2 km || 
|}

62901–63000 

|-bgcolor=#E9E9E9
| 62901 ||  || — || October 29, 2000 || Socorro || LINEAR || — || align=right | 4.1 km || 
|-id=902 bgcolor=#E9E9E9
| 62902 ||  || — || October 30, 2000 || Socorro || LINEAR || WIT || align=right | 2.2 km || 
|-id=903 bgcolor=#d6d6d6
| 62903 ||  || — || October 30, 2000 || Socorro || LINEAR || — || align=right | 3.9 km || 
|-id=904 bgcolor=#d6d6d6
| 62904 ||  || — || October 30, 2000 || Socorro || LINEAR || EOS || align=right | 4.1 km || 
|-id=905 bgcolor=#d6d6d6
| 62905 ||  || — || October 30, 2000 || Socorro || LINEAR || EOS || align=right | 5.2 km || 
|-id=906 bgcolor=#d6d6d6
| 62906 ||  || — || October 30, 2000 || Socorro || LINEAR || — || align=right | 6.5 km || 
|-id=907 bgcolor=#fefefe
| 62907 ||  || — || October 30, 2000 || Socorro || LINEAR || — || align=right | 2.0 km || 
|-id=908 bgcolor=#d6d6d6
| 62908 ||  || — || October 30, 2000 || Socorro || LINEAR || — || align=right | 4.0 km || 
|-id=909 bgcolor=#fefefe
| 62909 ||  || — || October 31, 2000 || Socorro || LINEAR || — || align=right | 2.1 km || 
|-id=910 bgcolor=#d6d6d6
| 62910 ||  || — || October 31, 2000 || Socorro || LINEAR || — || align=right | 11 km || 
|-id=911 bgcolor=#d6d6d6
| 62911 ||  || — || October 31, 2000 || Socorro || LINEAR || — || align=right | 5.0 km || 
|-id=912 bgcolor=#E9E9E9
| 62912 ||  || — || October 31, 2000 || Socorro || LINEAR || — || align=right | 2.6 km || 
|-id=913 bgcolor=#E9E9E9
| 62913 ||  || — || October 31, 2000 || Socorro || LINEAR || — || align=right | 4.7 km || 
|-id=914 bgcolor=#d6d6d6
| 62914 ||  || — || November 1, 2000 || Desert Beaver || W. K. Y. Yeung || — || align=right | 7.3 km || 
|-id=915 bgcolor=#d6d6d6
| 62915 ||  || — || November 1, 2000 || Desert Beaver || W. K. Y. Yeung || EOS || align=right | 7.6 km || 
|-id=916 bgcolor=#E9E9E9
| 62916 ||  || — || November 1, 2000 || Socorro || LINEAR || — || align=right | 3.3 km || 
|-id=917 bgcolor=#d6d6d6
| 62917 ||  || — || November 1, 2000 || Socorro || LINEAR || — || align=right | 8.6 km || 
|-id=918 bgcolor=#d6d6d6
| 62918 ||  || — || November 1, 2000 || Socorro || LINEAR || — || align=right | 5.4 km || 
|-id=919 bgcolor=#fefefe
| 62919 ||  || — || November 1, 2000 || Socorro || LINEAR || NYS || align=right | 1.5 km || 
|-id=920 bgcolor=#d6d6d6
| 62920 ||  || — || November 1, 2000 || Socorro || LINEAR || — || align=right | 7.1 km || 
|-id=921 bgcolor=#E9E9E9
| 62921 ||  || — || November 1, 2000 || Socorro || LINEAR || — || align=right | 7.4 km || 
|-id=922 bgcolor=#d6d6d6
| 62922 ||  || — || November 1, 2000 || Socorro || LINEAR || — || align=right | 6.5 km || 
|-id=923 bgcolor=#d6d6d6
| 62923 ||  || — || November 1, 2000 || Socorro || LINEAR || EOS || align=right | 4.0 km || 
|-id=924 bgcolor=#d6d6d6
| 62924 ||  || — || November 1, 2000 || Socorro || LINEAR || — || align=right | 7.7 km || 
|-id=925 bgcolor=#d6d6d6
| 62925 ||  || — || November 1, 2000 || Socorro || LINEAR || THM || align=right | 6.8 km || 
|-id=926 bgcolor=#fefefe
| 62926 ||  || — || November 1, 2000 || Socorro || LINEAR || — || align=right | 2.6 km || 
|-id=927 bgcolor=#d6d6d6
| 62927 ||  || — || November 1, 2000 || Socorro || LINEAR || NAE || align=right | 6.6 km || 
|-id=928 bgcolor=#E9E9E9
| 62928 ||  || — || November 1, 2000 || Socorro || LINEAR || — || align=right | 3.1 km || 
|-id=929 bgcolor=#E9E9E9
| 62929 ||  || — || November 1, 2000 || Socorro || LINEAR || HEN || align=right | 2.4 km || 
|-id=930 bgcolor=#d6d6d6
| 62930 ||  || — || November 1, 2000 || Socorro || LINEAR || EOS || align=right | 4.9 km || 
|-id=931 bgcolor=#fefefe
| 62931 ||  || — || November 1, 2000 || Socorro || LINEAR || V || align=right | 2.7 km || 
|-id=932 bgcolor=#d6d6d6
| 62932 ||  || — || November 1, 2000 || Socorro || LINEAR || — || align=right | 9.5 km || 
|-id=933 bgcolor=#fefefe
| 62933 ||  || — || November 1, 2000 || Socorro || LINEAR || NYS || align=right | 2.2 km || 
|-id=934 bgcolor=#d6d6d6
| 62934 ||  || — || November 1, 2000 || Socorro || LINEAR || HYG || align=right | 7.1 km || 
|-id=935 bgcolor=#fefefe
| 62935 ||  || — || November 1, 2000 || Socorro || LINEAR || — || align=right | 1.9 km || 
|-id=936 bgcolor=#d6d6d6
| 62936 ||  || — || November 1, 2000 || Socorro || LINEAR || — || align=right | 10 km || 
|-id=937 bgcolor=#fefefe
| 62937 ||  || — || November 1, 2000 || Socorro || LINEAR || NYS || align=right | 1.5 km || 
|-id=938 bgcolor=#fefefe
| 62938 ||  || — || November 1, 2000 || Socorro || LINEAR || — || align=right | 2.7 km || 
|-id=939 bgcolor=#E9E9E9
| 62939 ||  || — || November 1, 2000 || Socorro || LINEAR || — || align=right | 3.4 km || 
|-id=940 bgcolor=#E9E9E9
| 62940 ||  || — || November 1, 2000 || Socorro || LINEAR || RAF || align=right | 2.1 km || 
|-id=941 bgcolor=#E9E9E9
| 62941 ||  || — || November 1, 2000 || Socorro || LINEAR || HNA || align=right | 6.5 km || 
|-id=942 bgcolor=#E9E9E9
| 62942 ||  || — || November 1, 2000 || Socorro || LINEAR || — || align=right | 4.4 km || 
|-id=943 bgcolor=#d6d6d6
| 62943 ||  || — || November 1, 2000 || Socorro || LINEAR || — || align=right | 5.5 km || 
|-id=944 bgcolor=#E9E9E9
| 62944 ||  || — || November 1, 2000 || Socorro || LINEAR || — || align=right | 5.9 km || 
|-id=945 bgcolor=#fefefe
| 62945 ||  || — || November 1, 2000 || Socorro || LINEAR || — || align=right | 2.6 km || 
|-id=946 bgcolor=#E9E9E9
| 62946 ||  || — || November 1, 2000 || Socorro || LINEAR || — || align=right | 3.8 km || 
|-id=947 bgcolor=#d6d6d6
| 62947 ||  || — || November 1, 2000 || Socorro || LINEAR || — || align=right | 6.4 km || 
|-id=948 bgcolor=#d6d6d6
| 62948 ||  || — || November 1, 2000 || Socorro || LINEAR || — || align=right | 8.0 km || 
|-id=949 bgcolor=#d6d6d6
| 62949 ||  || — || November 1, 2000 || Socorro || LINEAR || BRA || align=right | 4.7 km || 
|-id=950 bgcolor=#d6d6d6
| 62950 ||  || — || November 1, 2000 || Socorro || LINEAR || ALA || align=right | 13 km || 
|-id=951 bgcolor=#E9E9E9
| 62951 ||  || — || November 1, 2000 || Socorro || LINEAR || — || align=right | 6.2 km || 
|-id=952 bgcolor=#E9E9E9
| 62952 ||  || — || November 1, 2000 || Socorro || LINEAR || MIT || align=right | 6.6 km || 
|-id=953 bgcolor=#d6d6d6
| 62953 ||  || — || November 1, 2000 || Socorro || LINEAR || EOS || align=right | 4.5 km || 
|-id=954 bgcolor=#d6d6d6
| 62954 ||  || — || November 1, 2000 || Socorro || LINEAR || — || align=right | 13 km || 
|-id=955 bgcolor=#fefefe
| 62955 ||  || — || November 1, 2000 || Socorro || LINEAR || — || align=right | 2.7 km || 
|-id=956 bgcolor=#fefefe
| 62956 ||  || — || November 1, 2000 || Socorro || LINEAR || — || align=right | 2.6 km || 
|-id=957 bgcolor=#fefefe
| 62957 ||  || — || November 1, 2000 || Socorro || LINEAR || NYS || align=right | 2.0 km || 
|-id=958 bgcolor=#d6d6d6
| 62958 ||  || — || November 1, 2000 || Socorro || LINEAR || — || align=right | 11 km || 
|-id=959 bgcolor=#d6d6d6
| 62959 ||  || — || November 1, 2000 || Socorro || LINEAR || 3:2 || align=right | 6.2 km || 
|-id=960 bgcolor=#d6d6d6
| 62960 ||  || — || November 1, 2000 || Socorro || LINEAR || — || align=right | 4.9 km || 
|-id=961 bgcolor=#fefefe
| 62961 ||  || — || November 1, 2000 || Socorro || LINEAR || V || align=right | 1.7 km || 
|-id=962 bgcolor=#d6d6d6
| 62962 ||  || — || November 1, 2000 || Socorro || LINEAR || — || align=right | 7.7 km || 
|-id=963 bgcolor=#E9E9E9
| 62963 ||  || — || November 1, 2000 || Socorro || LINEAR || — || align=right | 2.2 km || 
|-id=964 bgcolor=#E9E9E9
| 62964 ||  || — || November 1, 2000 || Socorro || LINEAR || — || align=right | 2.2 km || 
|-id=965 bgcolor=#d6d6d6
| 62965 ||  || — || November 2, 2000 || Socorro || LINEAR || KOR || align=right | 2.8 km || 
|-id=966 bgcolor=#d6d6d6
| 62966 ||  || — || November 1, 2000 || Socorro || LINEAR || — || align=right | 6.1 km || 
|-id=967 bgcolor=#fefefe
| 62967 ||  || — || November 2, 2000 || Socorro || LINEAR || — || align=right | 2.1 km || 
|-id=968 bgcolor=#d6d6d6
| 62968 ||  || — || November 2, 2000 || Socorro || LINEAR || 629 || align=right | 3.5 km || 
|-id=969 bgcolor=#d6d6d6
| 62969 ||  || — || November 2, 2000 || Socorro || LINEAR || THM || align=right | 6.3 km || 
|-id=970 bgcolor=#fefefe
| 62970 ||  || — || November 2, 2000 || Socorro || LINEAR || NYS || align=right | 1.6 km || 
|-id=971 bgcolor=#d6d6d6
| 62971 ||  || — || November 2, 2000 || Socorro || LINEAR || — || align=right | 5.4 km || 
|-id=972 bgcolor=#E9E9E9
| 62972 ||  || — || November 2, 2000 || Socorro || LINEAR || GEF || align=right | 2.4 km || 
|-id=973 bgcolor=#d6d6d6
| 62973 ||  || — || November 3, 2000 || Socorro || LINEAR || — || align=right | 5.2 km || 
|-id=974 bgcolor=#d6d6d6
| 62974 ||  || — || November 3, 2000 || Socorro || LINEAR || — || align=right | 7.0 km || 
|-id=975 bgcolor=#E9E9E9
| 62975 ||  || — || November 3, 2000 || Socorro || LINEAR || — || align=right | 2.8 km || 
|-id=976 bgcolor=#E9E9E9
| 62976 ||  || — || November 3, 2000 || Socorro || LINEAR || — || align=right | 2.6 km || 
|-id=977 bgcolor=#d6d6d6
| 62977 ||  || — || November 3, 2000 || Socorro || LINEAR || — || align=right | 3.5 km || 
|-id=978 bgcolor=#E9E9E9
| 62978 ||  || — || November 3, 2000 || Socorro || LINEAR || MAR || align=right | 3.4 km || 
|-id=979 bgcolor=#fefefe
| 62979 ||  || — || November 3, 2000 || Socorro || LINEAR || — || align=right | 2.3 km || 
|-id=980 bgcolor=#E9E9E9
| 62980 ||  || — || November 3, 2000 || Socorro || LINEAR || — || align=right | 2.7 km || 
|-id=981 bgcolor=#d6d6d6
| 62981 ||  || — || November 3, 2000 || Socorro || LINEAR || — || align=right | 7.6 km || 
|-id=982 bgcolor=#E9E9E9
| 62982 ||  || — || November 6, 2000 || Elmira || A. J. Cecce || EUN || align=right | 3.7 km || 
|-id=983 bgcolor=#E9E9E9
| 62983 ||  || — || November 2, 2000 || Socorro || LINEAR || — || align=right | 3.7 km || 
|-id=984 bgcolor=#d6d6d6
| 62984 ||  || — || November 1, 2000 || Desert Beaver || W. K. Y. Yeung || — || align=right | 9.3 km || 
|-id=985 bgcolor=#d6d6d6
| 62985 ||  || — || November 1, 2000 || Kitt Peak || Spacewatch || HYG || align=right | 6.3 km || 
|-id=986 bgcolor=#fefefe
| 62986 || 2000 WM || — || November 16, 2000 || Socorro || LINEAR || V || align=right | 1.6 km || 
|-id=987 bgcolor=#fefefe
| 62987 ||  || — || November 17, 2000 || Socorro || LINEAR || — || align=right | 5.0 km || 
|-id=988 bgcolor=#d6d6d6
| 62988 ||  || — || November 18, 2000 || Kitt Peak || Spacewatch || — || align=right | 8.0 km || 
|-id=989 bgcolor=#d6d6d6
| 62989 ||  || — || November 17, 2000 || Fountain Hills || C. W. Juels || — || align=right | 12 km || 
|-id=990 bgcolor=#d6d6d6
| 62990 ||  || — || November 17, 2000 || Socorro || LINEAR || — || align=right | 9.1 km || 
|-id=991 bgcolor=#fefefe
| 62991 ||  || — || November 20, 2000 || Socorro || LINEAR || — || align=right | 2.2 km || 
|-id=992 bgcolor=#d6d6d6
| 62992 ||  || — || November 23, 2000 || Farpoint || G. Hug || — || align=right | 3.5 km || 
|-id=993 bgcolor=#E9E9E9
| 62993 ||  || — || November 22, 2000 || Haleakala || NEAT || — || align=right | 7.0 km || 
|-id=994 bgcolor=#d6d6d6
| 62994 ||  || — || November 20, 2000 || Socorro || LINEAR || EMA || align=right | 7.9 km || 
|-id=995 bgcolor=#E9E9E9
| 62995 ||  || — || November 21, 2000 || Socorro || LINEAR || — || align=right | 4.7 km || 
|-id=996 bgcolor=#fefefe
| 62996 ||  || — || November 21, 2000 || Socorro || LINEAR || FLO || align=right | 1.4 km || 
|-id=997 bgcolor=#d6d6d6
| 62997 ||  || — || November 21, 2000 || Socorro || LINEAR || THM || align=right | 5.9 km || 
|-id=998 bgcolor=#d6d6d6
| 62998 ||  || — || November 21, 2000 || Socorro || LINEAR || — || align=right | 8.9 km || 
|-id=999 bgcolor=#E9E9E9
| 62999 ||  || — || November 25, 2000 || Fountain Hills || C. W. Juels || — || align=right | 6.7 km || 
|-id=000 bgcolor=#d6d6d6
| 63000 ||  || — || November 25, 2000 || Kitt Peak || Spacewatch || — || align=right | 8.5 km || 
|}

References

External links 
 Discovery Circumstances: Numbered Minor Planets (60001)–(65000) (IAU Minor Planet Center)

0062